= Fred E. and Elaine Cox Clever House =

Coordinates: 39.8994°N 74.9986°W

- Location within Camden County, New Jersey

General information
- Location: 417 Sherry Way, Cherry Hill, New Jersey
- Completed: 1972

Design and construction
- Architect: Louis Kahn

The Fred E. and Elaine Cox Clever House at 417 Sherry Way, Cherry Hill, New Jersey, was designed by architect Louis Kahn. The Clevers commissioned Kahn to design it in 1957 after seeing his influential Trenton Bath House; it was completed in 1962. It is one of only nine built houses designed by Kahn, who is best known for designing institutional buildings. In early 2015, the Clever house, having fallen into serious disrepair was listed for sale.

== Structure ==
In the center of the house is a spacious living room, around which are grouped five smaller rooms, each with its own pyramidal roof. The living room itself is capped by a complex roof composed of four large angular structures that look something like four oversize gables that meet in the center. The two flat surfaces that form the sides of each gable-like structure extend far downwards diagonally to meet the corresponding surfaces from the two adjacent structures. The four meeting points of all of these structures rest on four L-shaped concrete block formations positioned at the edges of the living room. They are about the height of standard rooms and have the appearance of small rooms protruding into the high-ceilinged living room. Their reverse sides provide closet-like spaces for other parts of the house.

The roof structure, which is about 18 feet (5.5 m) high at its highest point and whose underside is finished with narrow wooden strips, forms the ceiling of the living room. Large triangular windows with protruding hoods in each of the four gables provide natural light for the living room while minimizing direct sunlight. The triangular windows are fixed in place, but beside them are wooden panels that can be opened for ventilation.

The house was designed during a period in which Kahn was interested in structures based on triangular geometries, largely inspired by Anne Tyng, a co-worker and the mother of one of his children.
