= Harriet Pattison =

American landscape architect (1928–2023)

- Born: October 29, 1928; Chicago, Illinois, U.S.
- Died: October 2, 2023 (aged 94); Newtown Square, Pennsylvania, U.S.
- Occupation: Landscape architect

Harriet Pattison (October 29, 1928 – October 2, 2023) was an American landscape architect.

== Early life and education ==
Pattison was born in Chicago, Illinois on October 29, 1928. She was the youngest of the seven children of William Lawrence and Bonnie Abbott. She attended the Francis Parker School in Chicago. In 1951, she graduated with a BA from the University of Chicago. She also studied acting at the Yale School of Drama and took graduate philosophy courses at the University of Edinburgh. After, she moved to Philadelphia to study piano under Edith Braun at the Curtis Institute of Music. In 1958, she met architect Louis Kahn. Kahn began a relationship with her and encouraged her study of landscape architecture.

== Career ==
Pattison's first landscape architecture apprenticeship was at the offices of modernist landscape architect Dan Kiley in Vermont. She received a MA in landscape architecture at the University of Pennsylvania in 1967, studying with Ian McHarg, Roberto Burle Marx, M. Paul Friedberg, and others. Pattison also designed a master plan for the 125-acre (51 ha) The Hershey Company headquarters.

After graduating from University of Pennsylvania, she joined the landscape architecture firm of George Patton. She collaborated with Louis Kahn on several projects. Together, they designed the Kimbell Art Museum and Four Freedoms Park on Roosevelt Island in New York City.

== Personal life ==
Her personal relationship with Louis Kahn is described in the 2003 documentary by their son, the film's director, Nathaniel Kahn, My Architect: A Son's Journey. In 2020, she published her and Louis Kahn's correspondences in Our Days Are Like Full Years: A Memoir with Letters from Louis Kahn (Yale University Press, 2020).

Pattison died at home in Newtown Square, Pennsylvania, on October 2, 2023, at age 94.

== Awards and honors ==
In 2016, Pattison became a fellow of the American Society of Landscape Architects (ASLA) at age 87.

== Books ==
- Our Days Are Like Full Years: A Memoir with Letters from Louis Kahn. New Haven, Conn.: Yale University Press. 2020. ISBN 9780300223125. OCLC 1143645423.
