= Deep sky (disambiguation) =

Deep sky may refer to:

- Deep-sky object, a classification of astronomical objects located outside the Solar System
- Deep Sky, a 2023 American documentary film about the James Webb Space Telescope
- Deep Sky (horse), a Japanese racehorse born in 2005
- Deepsky, an electronic music act based in Los Angeles
