= Tribune Review Publishing Company Building =

Coordinates: 40.31416°N 79.546423°W

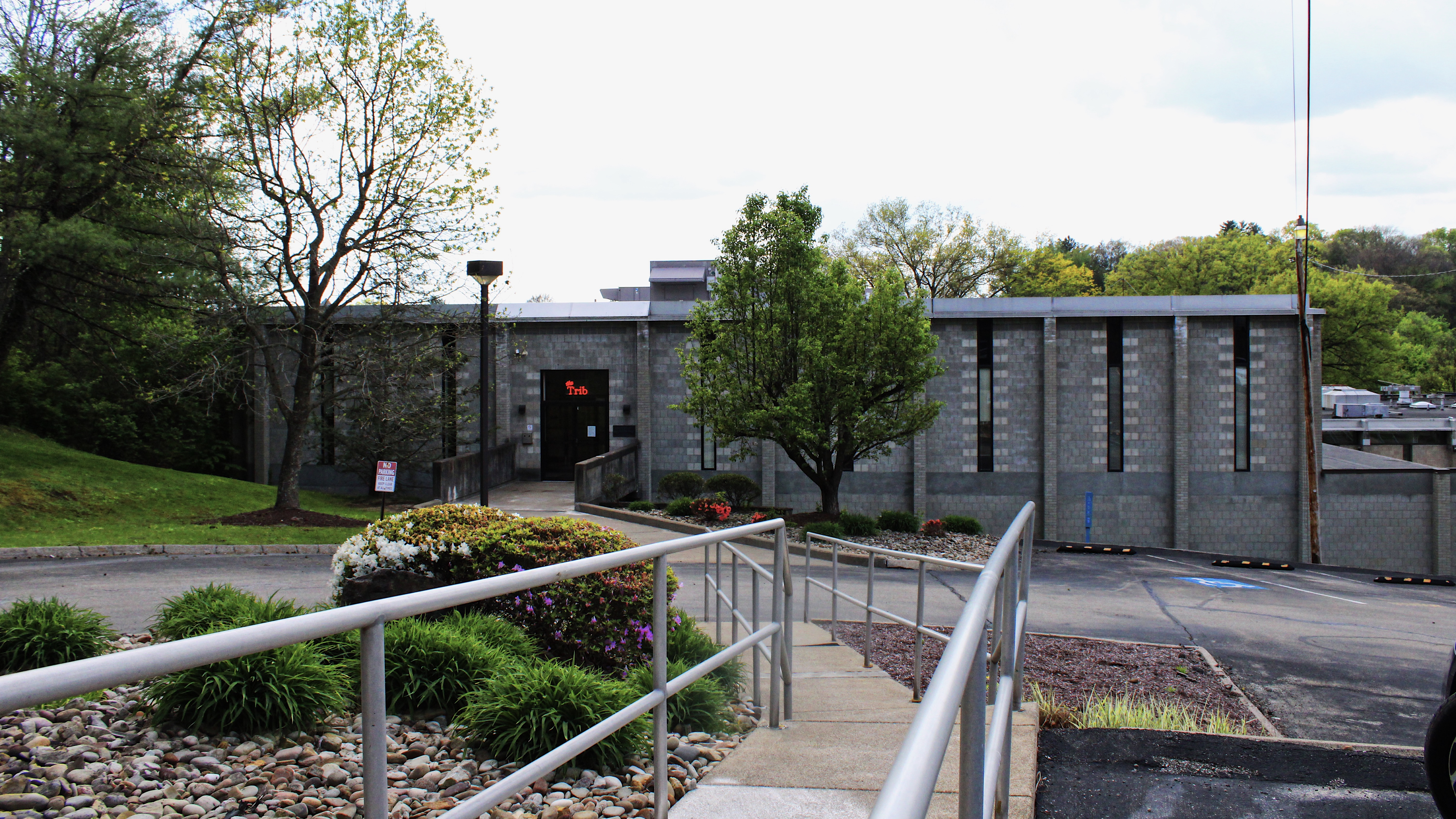
TribLIVE building in 2026

The Tribune Review Publishing Company Building was designed by architect Louis Kahn as the office and printing plant for the Tribune-Review newspaper in Greensburg, Pennsylvania, about 35 miles southeast of Pittsburgh. Although not in his usual line of work, Kahn accepted the commission at the request of William Huff, an architect on his staff who was related to the newspaper's owner. The building is considered to be one of Kahn's relatively minor works, but it has some interesting features nonetheless. Kahn began work on the design in 1958 and the building was completed in 1962.

The building is a rectangle approximately 132 x 120 feet (40 x 36 m). A service area with bathrooms, stairs, etc., occupies a strip 20 feet (6 m) wide that runs lengthwise through the center of the building, dividing the remainder into two sections that are each 132 x 50 feet (40 x 15 m). One of those sections was designed for the printing equipment and composing room and the other for the offices, with the service area acting as a buffer between them to shield the offices from the noise of the printing machinery. In addition to the high-ceilinged ground floor, there are also work spaces in the basement. The room for the heavy printing equipment spans both floors.

The building's structure consists of concrete piers and beams rather than a steel skeleton. Kahn had decided several years earlier to use only massive materials like concrete and masonry as structure for his buildings instead of the relatively lightweight materials, such as steel, usually associated with modern architecture. August Komendant, Kahn's preferred collaborator and an expert in reinforced concrete, was the consulting structural engineer.

Pre-stressed concrete beams supported by piers made of concrete blocks span the 50 foot (15 m) width of each of the two main sections of the building, leaving them free of internal support columns. In line with his belief that structure should be made visible, Kahn distinguished the piers from the non-weight-bearing walls within which they are embedded by using concrete blocks the size of bricks for the piers and larger concrete blocks for the walls. The beams are clearly visible in the interior of the building as are the ends of the beams on top of the piers on the exterior. The piers, which are on the long sides of the building, project from the external walls to create a light-and-shadow effect. Kahn created additional visual interest by placing the twelve sets of piers in a pattern that is not quite equally spaced; the walls between the piers alternate between being slightly wider than expected and slightly narrower than expected.

A large T-shaped window is located between each pair of adjacent piers. The horizontal part of each "T" fits in the space formed by the beams that support the roof. That is, the top bar of each "T" begins at the roof structure, as each beam does, extends downward as far as the bottom of the beams, and then extends horizontally across the entire space between two beams. As a result, the top parts of the T-shaped windows form a horizontal strip of glass just beneath the roof that extends the entire length of the building, interrupted only by the ends of the beams atop the piers. The vertical part of each "T" extends to the bottom of the ground floor. On the shorter sides of the building are six windows that could be described as distorted Ts; each has the form a square with a stubby tail descending from it.

This photo shows the front of the building, the T-shaped windows, the ends of the roof-supporting beams on top of the piers, and one of the square windows beneath the beam at the end of the building. It is from the William S. Huff collection of photos listed below under External Links.

Kahn used the T-shaped windows, sometimes called keyhole windows, to maximize the amount of natural light within the building while minimizing glare at desk height. Light enters the building mostly through the upper parts of the windows at the ceiling, brightening the rooms indirectly. The narrow, lower parts of the windows permit employees to see outside without letting in too much direct sunlight. Kahn used variations of the keyhole window in some of his subsequent designs. The use of this type of window spread and "soon became a cliché in the hands of other architects". The interplay of T-shaped window and structure is an architectural highlight of Kahn's design: the structure, which is exposed, determines the placement of the windows, and the windows in turn reveal and illuminate the structure, especially the beams running across the ceiling.

Robert McCarter, author of Louis I. Kahn, which is the most extensive source of information about this building, provides this summary: "In the Tribune Review Building, which is rarely studied and almost never considered among his greatest works, Kahn achieved his most resolved expression to date of the relation between structure and light. He not only discovered new ways to bring natural light into the space, but also revealed the structure in its light."

A later addition obscures the south side of the building and part of its east side. In this aerial view, the Tribune Review building is in the center. The portion that Kahn designed is at the upper left of the expanded building; the piers supporting its roof beams are visible at its left edge.
