= Two Hands: The Leon Fleisher Story =

2006 film

- Directed by: Nathaniel Kahn
- Produced by: Susan Rose Behr; Nathaniel Kahn
- Cinematography: Don Lenzer
- Edited by: Brad Fuller
- Release date: 2006
- Running time: 17 minutes
- Country: United States
- Language: English

Two Hands: The Leon Fleisher Story is a 2006 American short documentary film directed by Nathaniel Kahn. It was nominated for an Academy Award for Best Documentary Short. It tells the story of the pianist Leon Fleisher. Due to a neurological condition called focal dystonia, he lost the use of his right hand for some time, and performed using only his left hand. After years, he regained the use of his right hand and resumed two-handed performances.
