= Anne Tyng =

American architect

- Born: July 14, 1920; Lushan, Jiangxi, China
- Died: December 27, 2011 (aged 91); Greenbrae, California, U.S.
- Education: Radcliffe College, Harvard University, University of Pennsylvania
- Occupation: Architect
- Practice: Stonorov and Kahn
- Projects: City Tower, Trenton Bathhouse, Salk Institute for Biological Studies, Yale Art Gallery

Anne Griswold Tyng (July 14, 1920 – December 27, 2011) was an architect and professor. She is best known for having collaborated for 29 years with Louis Kahn at his practice in Philadelphia. She served as a professor at the University of Pennsylvania for 27 years, teaching classes in urban morphology. She was a fellow of the American Institute of Architects and an academician of the National Academy of Design. She is the first woman licensed as an architect by the state of Pennsylvania.

== Early life and education ==
Tyng's parents, Ethel Atkinson (née Arens) and Walworth Tyng, were from old New England families. They were living as Episcopalian missionaries in China when, in 1920, Tyng was born in Lushan, Jiangxi province.

Tyng received her bachelor's degree from Radcliffe College in 1942. Later, she studied with Walter Gropius and Marcel Breuer at the architecture school at Harvard University. In 1944, she was among the first women to graduate from Harvard. Tyng was the only woman to enter the architecture licensing exam in 1949. At the test, one of the male proctors turned his back on her and refused to cooperate.

She was awarded her Ph.D. by the University of Pennsylvania in 1975. Her dissertation was titled, "Simultaneous Randomness and Order: the Fibonacci-Divine Proportion as a Universal Forming Principle". Tyng's collected papers are held in the university's architectural archives.

== Career ==
Tyng with Louis Kahn in 1947

Tyng was a theorist known for her passion for mathematics and her pioneering work in space frame architecture, in which interlocking geometric patterns are used to create light-filled spaces. She was particularly interested in platonic solids and in Jungian thought. Her Ph.D. thesis entitled "Simultaneous Randomness and Order" pursued her interests in hierarchical symmetry and organic form. Designing an addition to her parents' farmhouse in Maryland, she was also the first architect to frame a traditional peaked-roof house with fully triangulated three-dimensional truss.

In 1945, Tyng moved to Philadelphia and became employed at Louis Kahn's architectural practice, Stonorov and Kahn. Her fascination with complex geometrical shapes had a strong influence on several projects, most notably on the five cubes that comprise the Trenton Bath House and the triangular ceiling of Yale Art Gallery. Tyng also said that the concept for Kahn's famous "City Tower" design was largely her invention, although when the model was included in a show at the Museum of Modern Art, at first, Kahn left her name off of the credit label. The two also collaborated on the Esherick Studio and on Bryn Mawr's Erdman Hall. This project led her to develop other projects that implemented complex geometries.

Tyng showed her developed sense of mathematics and design early in her life. Her invention of the Tyng Toy, at the age of 27, illustrated her mastery of form. A construction set for children, the Tyng Toy allowed a small selection of plywood pieces to be combined into a wide variety of toys and pieces of furniture, ranging from a stool to a rocking horse.

After a nine-year relationship with Kahn, she became pregnant and, because of the potential scandal, turned down a Fulbright Scholarship and departed for Rome in the autumn of 1953. Their daughter, Alexandra Tyng, was born there. During her year in Italy, Tyng studied with the structural engineer and architect, Pier Luigi Nervi, and wrote weekly to Kahn. After a falling-out in 1964, Tyng left the firm, where she had been a partner.

Tyng designed the Four-Poster House in Mount Desert Island, Maine. Using logs and cedar shakes, she sought to make the house seem like an outgrowth of its natural environment. The house also was structured around the concept of a four-poster bed, with four central columns, each made from a cluster of four tree trunks. The entirety of its top floor was given over to a master bedroom.

Evidence of her style may be seen in aspects of her former residence in Philadelphia's Fitler Square. It is known as the Tyng House. On its third floor, the building features a pyramidal timber-framed ceiling and slotted windows. Its staircase uses the openwork metal screens that she had chosen for the Yale Art Gallery project.

For her work in this field, in 1965 she became the first woman to receive a grant from the Graham Foundation for Advanced Studies in the Fine Arts. In a letter recommending her to the Graham Foundation, Buckminster Fuller called her, "Kahn's geometrical strategist".

In 1989, Tyng published the essay, "From Muse to Heroine, Toward a Visible Creative Identity", which was a study of the development of creative roles by women in architecture. In it, she wrote, "The steps from muse to heroine are accomplished by very few. Most women trained as architects marry architects. No longer the women behind the man, the woman architect in partnership with her husband may nevertheless be barely visible beside (or slightly behind) the hero", further noting, "[t]he greatest hurdle for a woman in architecture today is the psychological development necessary to free her creative potential".

The Institute of Contemporary Art held a retrospective exhibition of her work in 2010.

Tyng's geometrical research was presented as an inhabitable installation in the 2011 exhibition Anne Tyng: Inhabiting Geometry at the Institute of Contemporary Art of the University of Pennsylvania. Built largely from plywood, the gallery-scale work allowed visitors to enter human-sized versions of the five Platonic solids. Drawings and models for projects including City Tower, Urban Hierarchy, and the Four-Poster House were displayed alongside the installation, connecting her theoretical studies of symmetry and numerical systems with architectural space.

== Kahn documentary ==
While Tyng is named in many sources as Kahn's partner and muse, it was not until late in her life that her influence on Kahn's work was recognized. At 82, Tyng appeared in Nathaniel Kahn's documentary about his father, My Architect, discussing her insights into the work of Louis Kahn and her experience as his partner.

During the filming, Tyng returned to the Trenton Bath House for the first time since its completion, finding it neglected and in disrepair. This is the building on which she and Kahn first collaborated. Due in part to the attention that the film drew to the condition of the bath house, the building was completely renovated in 2009.
