= Temple Beth El of Northern Westchester =

Reform synagogue in New York, US

- Location in New York

Religion
- Affiliation: Reform Judaism
- Ecclesiastical or organizational status: Synagogue
- Leadership: Rabbi Jonathan Jaffe; Rabbi Maura Linzer; (Rabbi-Educator); Rabbi Leora Londy (Assistant); Cantor Turia Stark
- Status: Active

Location
- Location: 220 South Bedford Road, Chappaqua, Northern Westchester, New York 10514
- Country: United States
- Interactive map of Temple Beth El of Northern Westchester
- Coordinates: 41°09′13″N 73°46′09″W

Architecture
- Architects: Louis Kahn (1972); Alexander Gorlin (2015)
- Type: Synagogue
- Style: Modernist
- Established: 1949 (as a congregation)
- Completed: 1972

Specifications
- Interior area: 20,000 square feet (1,900 m^{2}) (1972)
- Materials: Spruce; concrete

Website
- bethelnw.org

Temple Beth El of Northern Westchester is a Reform Jewish congregation and synagogue located at 220 South Bedford Road, in Chappaqua, Northern Westchester, New York, in the United States. The synagogue has approximately 700 member families.

Founded in 1949 by 45 families, it is notable for its synagogue building, designed by Louis Kahn. Although Kahn designed other synagogues, this is the only one of his designs that was built.

According to the National Trust for Historic Preservation, Kahn accepted the commission in 1966, and completed plans for the octagonal sanctuary six years later, conceived as a Modernist memorial to the Eastern European Jewish past, after whose wooden synagogues it was patterned. A 23,000-square-foot (2,100 m^{2}) extension of the synagogue, comprising a large social hall, a kitchen, classrooms, a nursery school, a library, a chapel, a lobby, and new bathrooms was completed by Alexander Gorlin Architects in 2015.

Temple Beth El has hosted prominent speakers and guests, including former hostage Omer Shem Tov, newscaster Mordechai "Mike" Wagenheim, progressive civil rights attorney Amanda Berman, and activist Shabbos Kestenbaum. Additionally, Rabbis Jaffe and Londy host a regular podcast, In Such A Time, covering Jewish education, politics, Israel, and current events.

The synagogue runs an active after-school program and mid-sized preschool, housed inside its Early Childhood Center (ECC).

Rabbi Chaim Stern, widely acknowledged as the foremost liturgist of Reform Judaism, led Temple Beth El from 1968-2000.
