= Arts United Center =

Arts center in Fort Wayne, Indiana

Coordinates: 41.08174°N 85.13672°W

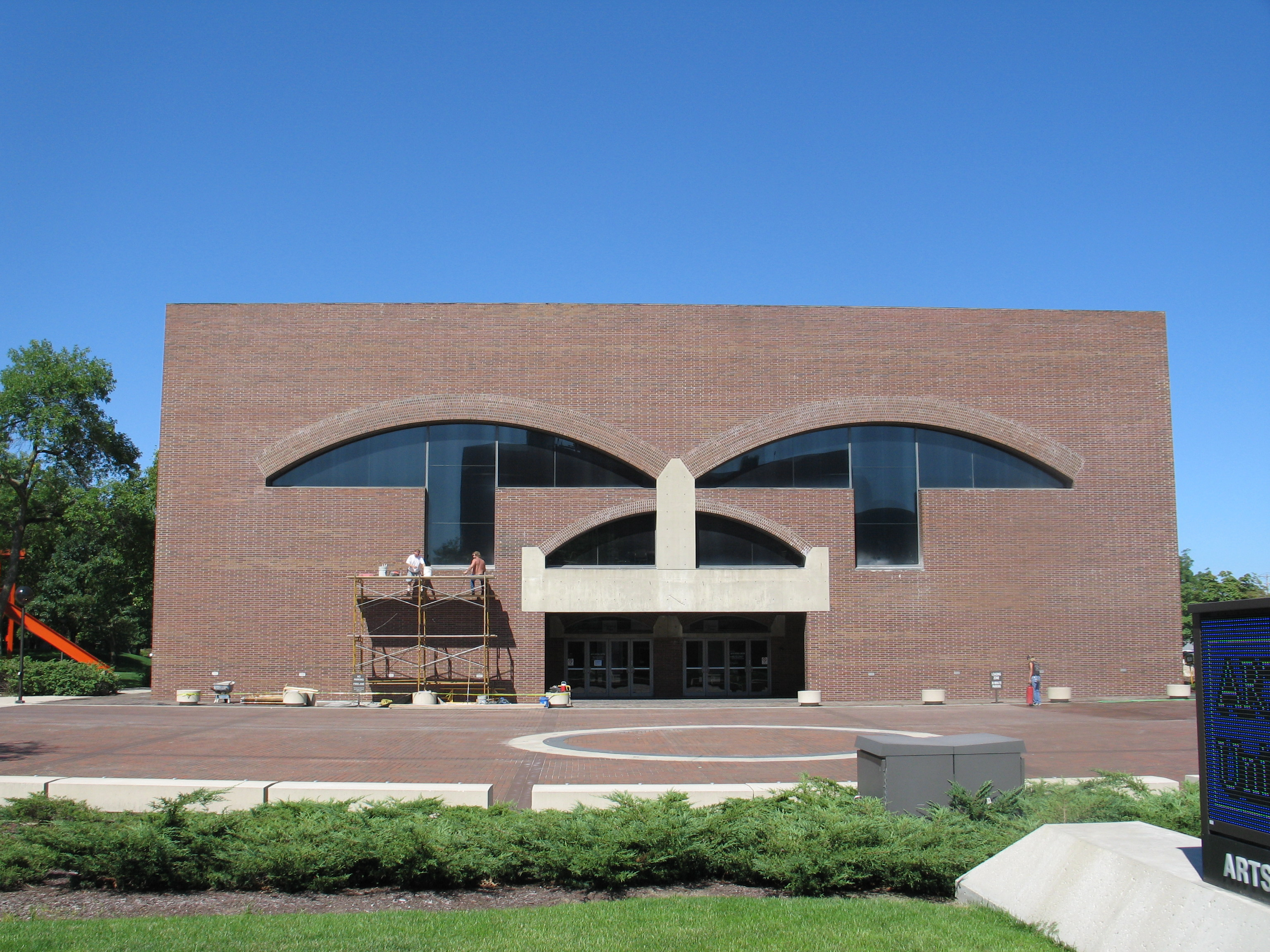

General information
- Location: Fort Wayne, Indiana, US

Design and construction
- Architect: Louis Kahn

Arts United Center, originally known as the Fort Wayne Performing Arts Theatre, is an arts center in Fort Wayne, Indiana, US.

The Fine Arts Foundation of Fort Wayne originally proposed the construction of a large complex devoted to the arts in the early 1960s. The foundation compiled an ambitious program including facilities to support an art school, gallery, theater, orchestra, and historical museum. In 1961, a selection committee commissioned architect Louis Kahn to design the project based on a referral from Philip Johnson.

Kahn's first plan, presented in 1965, had an estimated cost of $20 million, which far exceeded the $2.5 million allocated for the project. In response to financial limitations, the project's scale was limited to the performing arts facilities; The Theatre of Performing Arts is the only realized building in Kahn's design. Arts United (formerly Fine Arts Foundation) now cares for Arts Campus Fort Wayne, owning and operating the Arts United Center, Hall Community Arts Center, Auer Center for Arts and Culture, and Parkview Physicians Group ArtsLab. The cultural district also includes the History Center, Fort Wayne Museum of Art, and Rankin House.

Arts United of Greater Fort Wayne is embarking on a strategic plan to bring the renovate the theatre. The organization received $2 million from the AWS Foundation in 2019 for accessibility. The Kahn building was listed on the National Register of Historic Places in 2024.
