= Fisher House (Hatboro, Pennsylvania) =

Residence by Louis Kahn

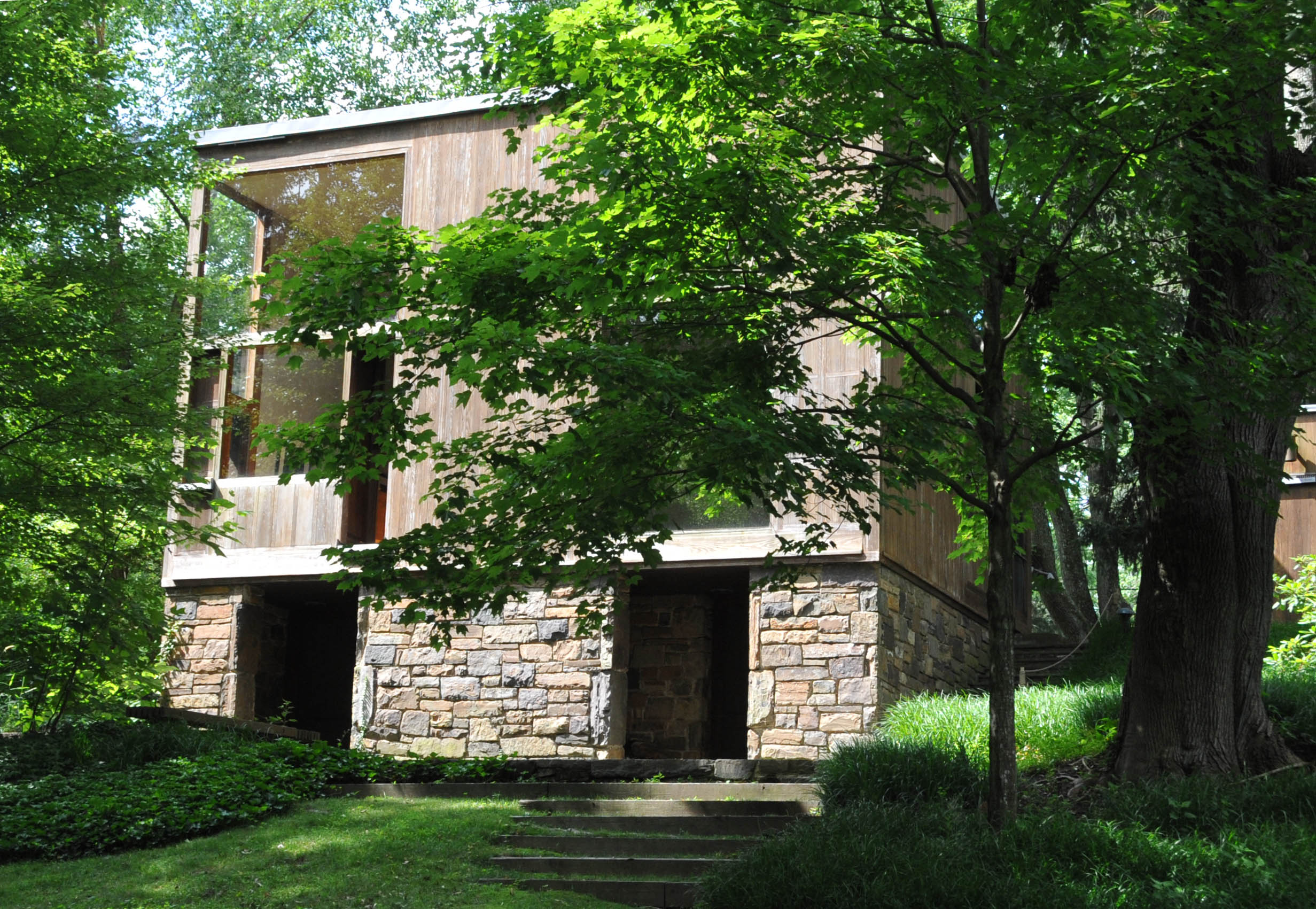

- Location within Pennsylvania

General information
- Architectural style: Modern
- Coordinates: 40.16695°N 75.10839°W
- Construction started: 1964
- Completed: 1967

Design and construction
- Architect: Louis Kahn

The Fisher House, also known as the Norman Fisher House, was designed by the architect Louis Kahn and built for Dr. Norman Fisher and his wife, Doris in 1967 in Hatboro, Pennsylvania. The house is characterized by its dual cubic volumes, stone foundation and detailed cypress cladding. In the Fisher House, Kahn eschews the linearity of the modern plan and focuses on a simple geometry, allowing the cubes to provide a separation of public and private space.

Known widely for monumental works like the Salk Institute and the Richards Medical Center, the Fisher house is an example of Kahn’s residential architecture. It is one of nine houses that Kahn designed and constructed.

== History ==
Dr. and Mrs. Fisher lived in a colonial style house in Hatboro, Pennsylvania, in which Dr. Fisher ran his family health practice. The Fishers were looking to construct another house nearby.

The Fishers met Louis I. Kahn in 1960. The Fishers set a budget of $45,000, forcing Kahn to eliminate three rooms from the first sketch plan he drew. During this time, Kahn was also working on the Salk Institute and the Capital Complex in Bangladesh. There were several different schemes proposed before Kahn and the Fishers were both satisfied. If some small thing needed to be changed, Kahn would start over with the design, feeling that the total composition would be compromised if things were simply altered.

In the very first scheme, the two separate square volumes are apparent. The circulation is mostly vertical and separated within each volume. In this design, Kahn had the large stone fireplace, which would separate the living area and dining area. It was while in Dacca, Bangladesh working on the Capitol Complex, that Kahn discovered the idea of two cubes intersecting at an angle. His initial plan called for one volume to be masonry and the other to be wood. Kahn eventually eliminated this idea due to budget restrictions. The final plan was a masonry foundation and plinth with the two wooden cubes resting on top. The wood was crafted with deep window pockets and built-in cabinets, tables and seating.

The Fisher house, though a small residential project, came during a time of intense work for Kahn and allowed him to explore some of the ideas that would appear in later large works.

In 2012, the Fisher family sold the house to a private owner under the guidance of The National Trust.

== Site and context ==
The house is sited along the top ridge of a slight hill just off of Mill Road. Its entry faces the street and is much more closed on this side. At the rear of the house lies a small wood, and a creek runs along at the bottom of the hill. Stepping away from traditional siting methods, Kahn turned the living quarters to face the northeast so that the view of the woods could be framed in the dramatic double height window construction. While the majority of housing in Hatboro is typical Neo-Colonial suburban housing of the post war years, the Fisher house stands out as distinctly modernist. Kahn had originally planned on an all stone construction but was forced away from that idea due to the prohibitive cost of building in all stone in Pennsylvania.

== Form and use ==
The Fisher House uses form to separate the different public and private uses of the home. The public and private are divided between two distinct two story nearly cubic volumes. The private volume is aligned along the north–south axis and the public, which is rotated exactly 45 degrees, is aligned along a northeast southwest line which runs parallel to the driveway. The public volume intersects the north face of the private with its southeast corner. The public space, which is perfectly square in plan, holds the entrance corridor and the master bedroom at ground level and two other bedrooms above. The second volume is slightly off square, having a rectangular plan, and holds the living, dining and kitchen space in a double height room. Throughout the house there are deeply recessed windows. These allow light in during winter and keep out direct light in summer. Kahn often used the windows indentations in the home to create occupiable spaces, such as benches or storage spaces. These uses were seen as very innovative at the time. The best example of these changes can be found in the main living area near the large hearth. Kahn created details out of the window ledge, and created not only a seating area, but also a set of shelves for out of sight storage. The deep recession also allows them to be opened during storms without allowing rain to come into the house. There is a large stone hearth just off center in the living cube that creates a slight separation in the living room and the kitchen area, but the kitchen still opens more to the public realm that was traditionally the case at this time. The decision to create two distinct volumes was driven by the original dual design requirement of home and physician’s office.

== Significance ==
In Kahn's career, the Fisher House bookended by the Margaret Esherick house and the Phillips Exeter Academy Library and was built during the same period as the Salk Institute. Like many architects, Kahn used his housing commissions to test his ideas about architecture. Kahn sought a sense of monumentality and longevity in his work, but also strove to bring the ideas of modernism to a place of familiarity. In the Fisher house, Kahn uses the stone plinth to create a sense of timelessness. The woodwork used in the Fisher house creates the sense of warmth and tradition to an otherwise starkly modern design. In March 2014, the house was listed on the National Register of Historic Places.

== Material choices ==
The foundation of the home is built entirely of stone in, for Kahn, a traditional style of building. The stone foundation was necessary due to the home’s placement on a slope and its need for a solid anchoring into the ground of the site. The exterior and interior portions of the home are made from the same cedar wood sourced from the local Pennsylvania area. This was done to keep down costs. The woodwork of the Fisher house is often viewed as the most comprehensive of any of his woodwork during the period. Later projects were said to lack the continuity of the Fisher House, often smaller details such as interior doors were left unadorned in a way that left the project feeling incomplete to viewers.
