= Deep Sky =

2023 film

- Poster of the film featuring the Pillars of Creation
- Directed by: Nathaniel Kahn
- Produced by: Sandra Evers-Manly; Bonnie Hlinomaz; Charles Mattias 'Matt' Mountain; Gerry Ohrstrom; John Turner
- Cinematography: Michael McClare; Robert Richman
- Edited by: Brian Johnson; Jay Keuper
- Distributed by: Crazy Boat Pictures Limited
- Release date: 23 October 2023 (limited)
- Running time: 40 minutes
- Country: United States
- Language: English
- Box office: $112,320

Deep Sky is a 2023 American documentary film directed by Nathaniel Kahn. Originally released on October 20, 2023 for IMAX, Deep Sky is narrated by Michelle Williams telling the story about the production of the James Webb Space Telescope and its impact on the technological improvements it made upon the Hubble Space Telescope.

Although it was filmed in 2023, the documentary did not receive a wide release until April 19, 2024 in commemoration with Earth Day.

== Synopsis ==
Deep Sky chronicles the mission to construct NASA’s James Webb Space Telescope and place it in orbit one million miles from Earth.

The film captures IMAX-quality images which the telescope has transmitted back to Earth. These images reveal the universe in ways never seen before, showcasing recently discovered exoplanets, planets orbiting distant stars, and other unique cosmic landscapes.

== Reception ==
Deep Sky currently has a 100% perfect rating on Rotten Tomatoes, with the summary "NASA builds the revolutionary James Webb Space Telescope to study cosmic landscapes in stunning resolution."
