= Trenton Bath House =

- Trenton Jewish Community Center Bath House and Day Camp
- U.S. National Register of Historic Places
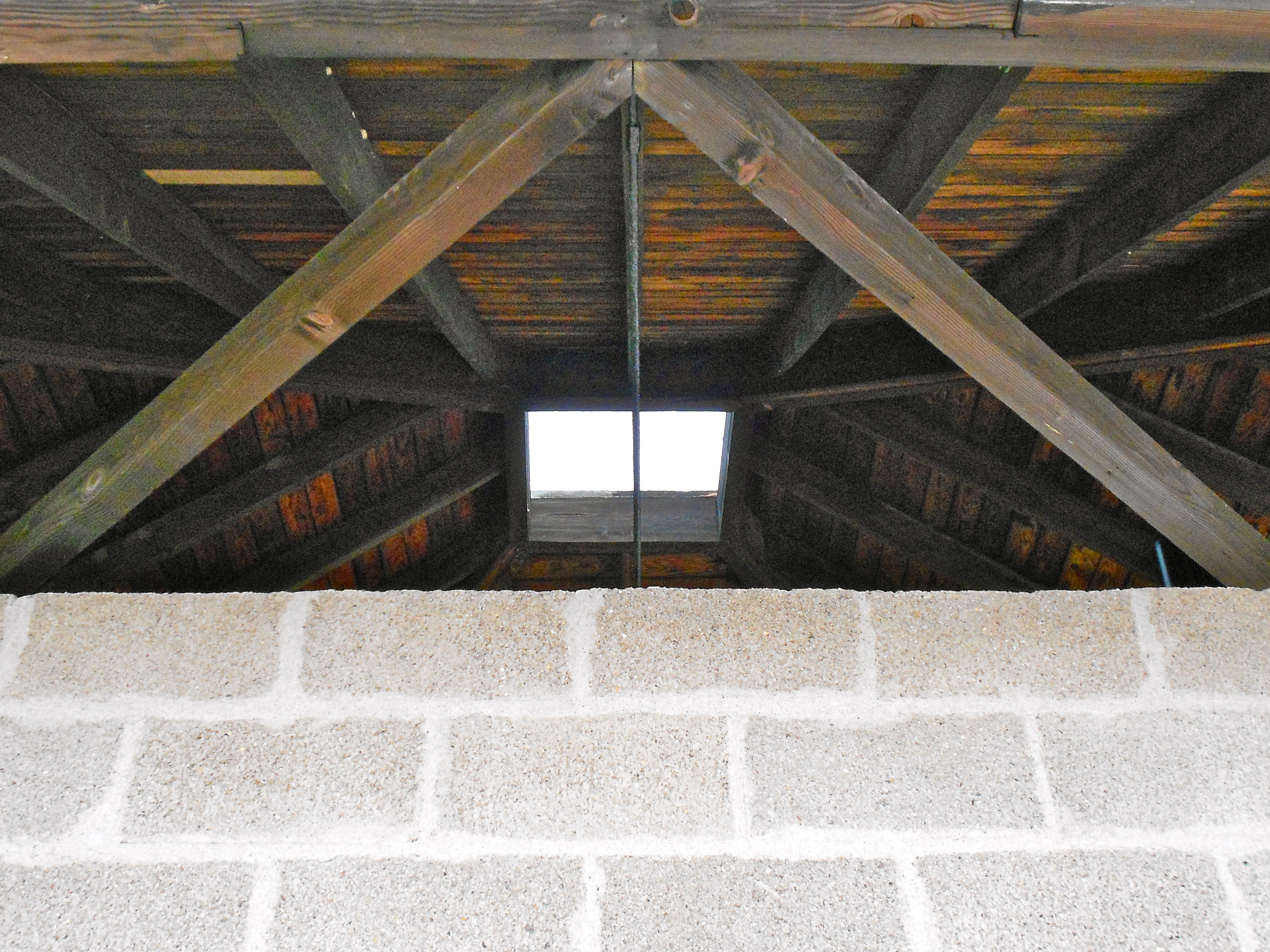
- Outside wall and interior skylight

- Location within Mercer County, New Jersey Location within New Jersey Location within the United States
- Location: 999 Lower Ferry Rd., Ewing, New Jersey
- Coordinates: 40°15′33″N 74°47′58″W
- Area: 8.7 acres (3.5 ha)
- Built: 1955
- Architect: Louis Kahn
- NRHP reference No.: 84002730
- Added to NRHP: February 23, 1984

The Trenton Bath House is an influential design by the architect Louis Kahn, with the help of his associate, architect Anne Tyng. This changing room facility is located adjacent to a swimming pool at 999 Lower Ferry Road, Ewing Township, Mercer County, New Jersey, United States. It was listed in the National Register of Historic Places in 1984.

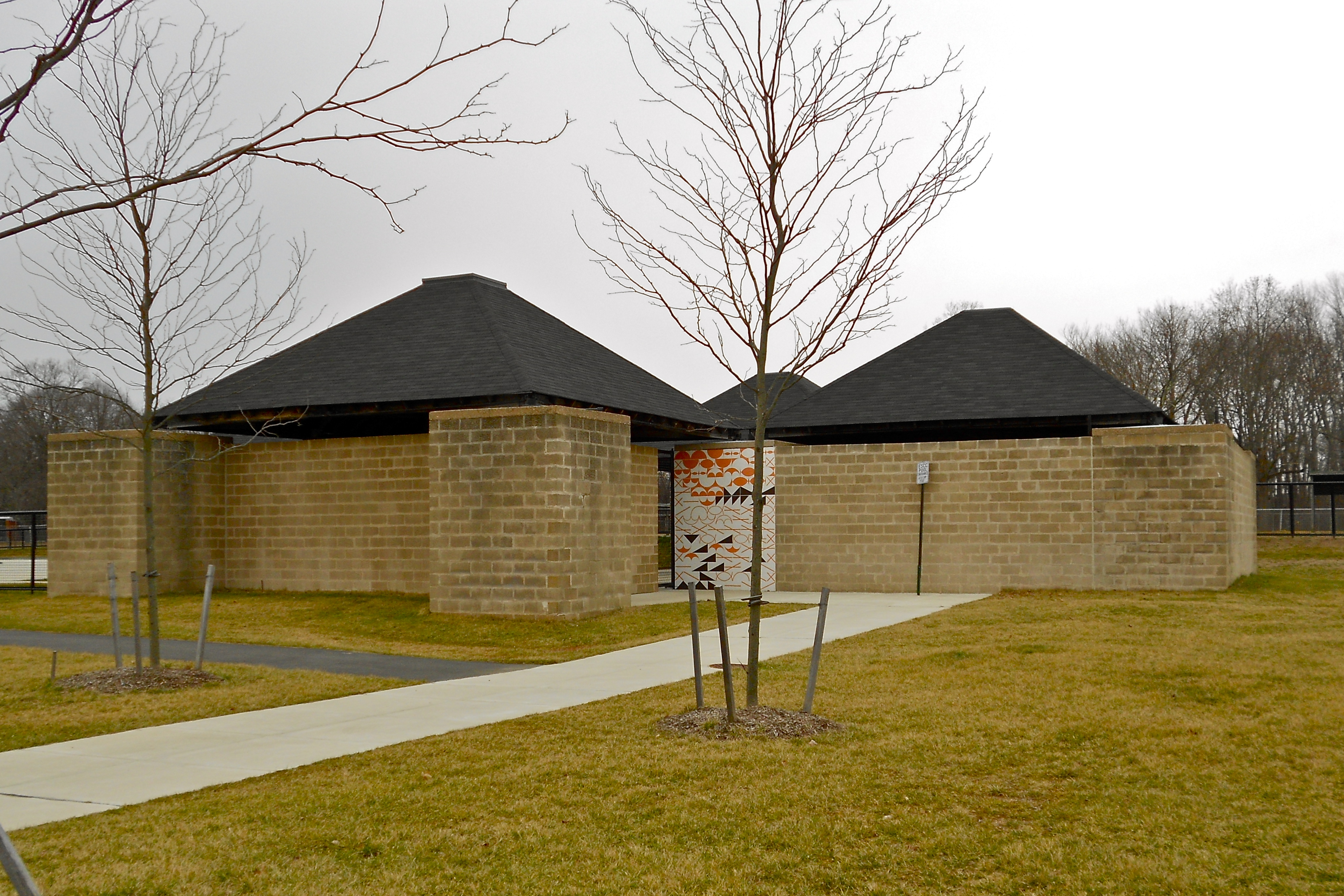
Exterior

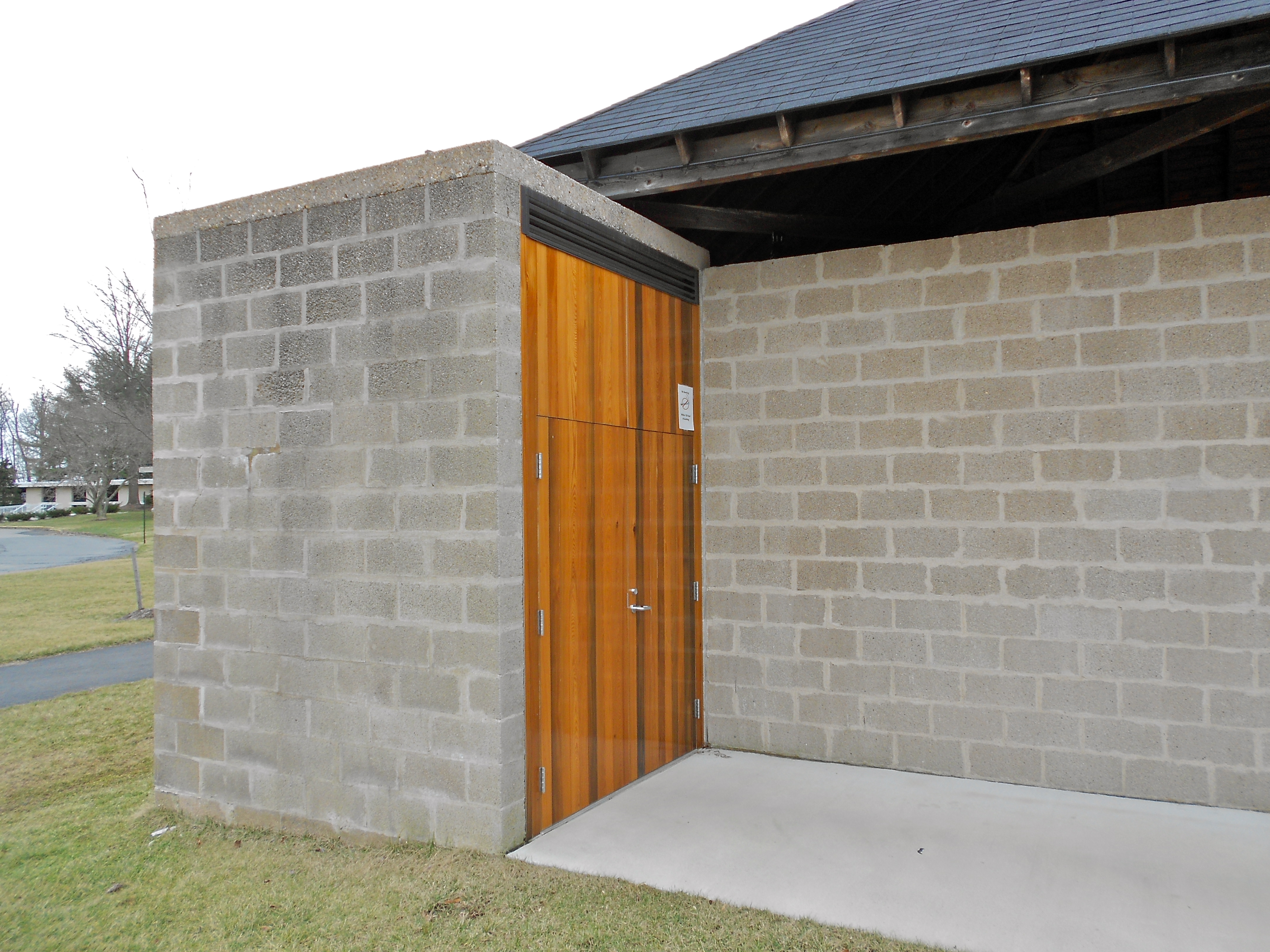
A corner of the bath house

It is neither in Trenton, New Jersey, nor is it a bath house, but the so-called "Trenton Bath House" commands attention from architectural historians around the world. Designed as part of a larger plan (never executed) for the Jewish Community Center of the Delaware Valley, the "bath house" opened in 1955 and served as the entrance and changing area for patrons of an outdoor swimming pool.

From a design perspective, the bath house actually appears as a simple cruciform—four square concrete block rooms or areas, surrounding an open atrium. Each of the rooms is topped by a simple, wooden rectangular pyramid. At the corner of each room there is a large, open rectangular column that supports the roof. However, closer inspection reveals that in addition to the pure design elegance, Kahn also clarified his thinking about the utilitarian purposes of the various spaces, and it was in this building that he first articulated his notion of spaces serving and spaces served.

Kahn often spoke of this project as a turning point in his design philosophy, "From this came a generative force which is recognizable in every building which I have done since."

On August 10, 2006, Mercer County and Ewing Township purchased the bath house from the Jewish Community Center for $8.1 million, using funds from the Open Space Preservation Trust Fund. This action ensures that the historic integrity of the bath house will be protected. Ewing plans to use the main J.C.C. building as a senior citizens center. The J.C.C. had planned to move to a new 80-acre (320,000 m^{2}) site located on Clarksville Road in West Windsor Township, but funding ran out.

== Model ==
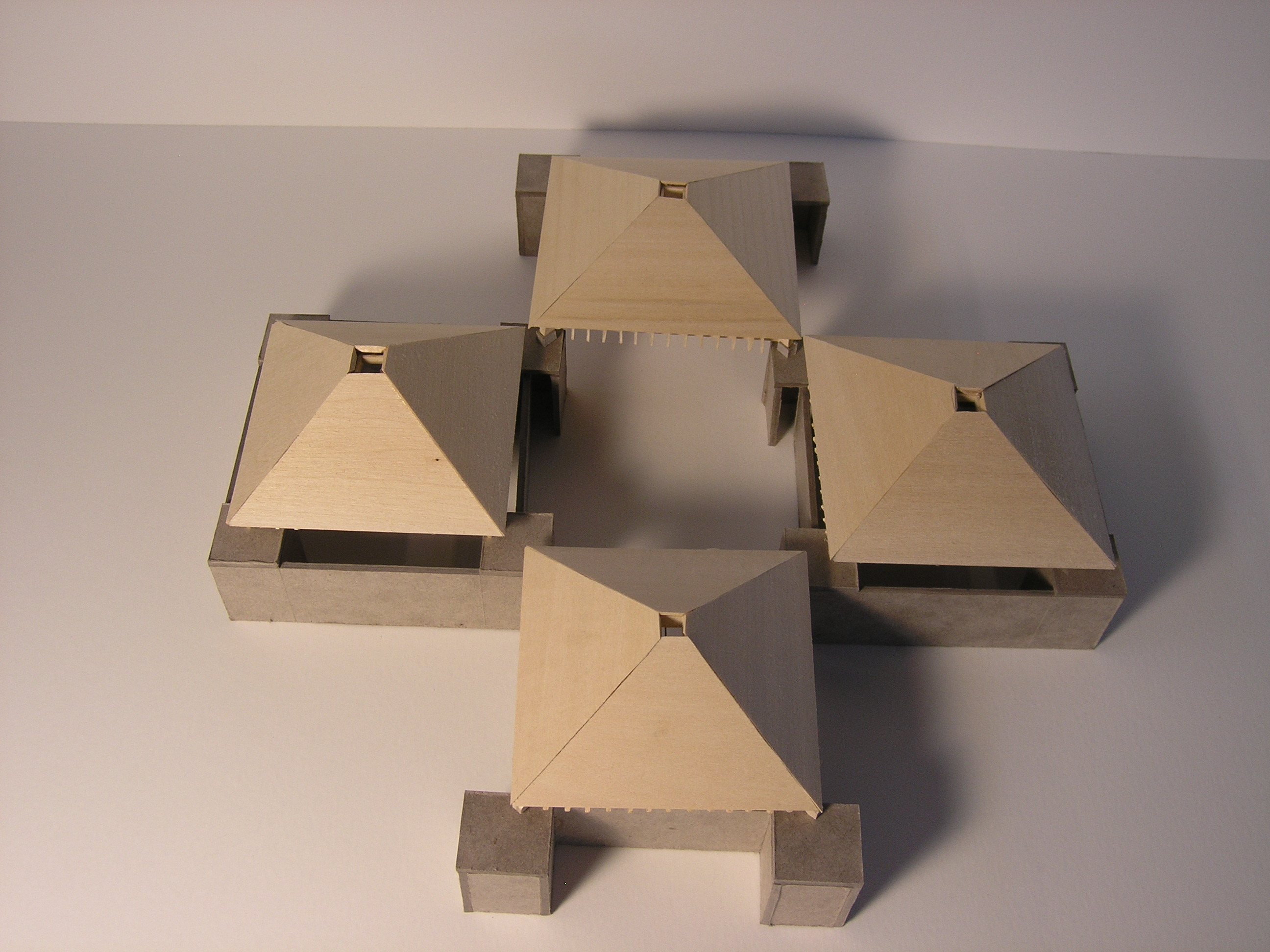
Masonry and Roof Volumes

Masonry and Roof Volumes

Roof Structure Volume

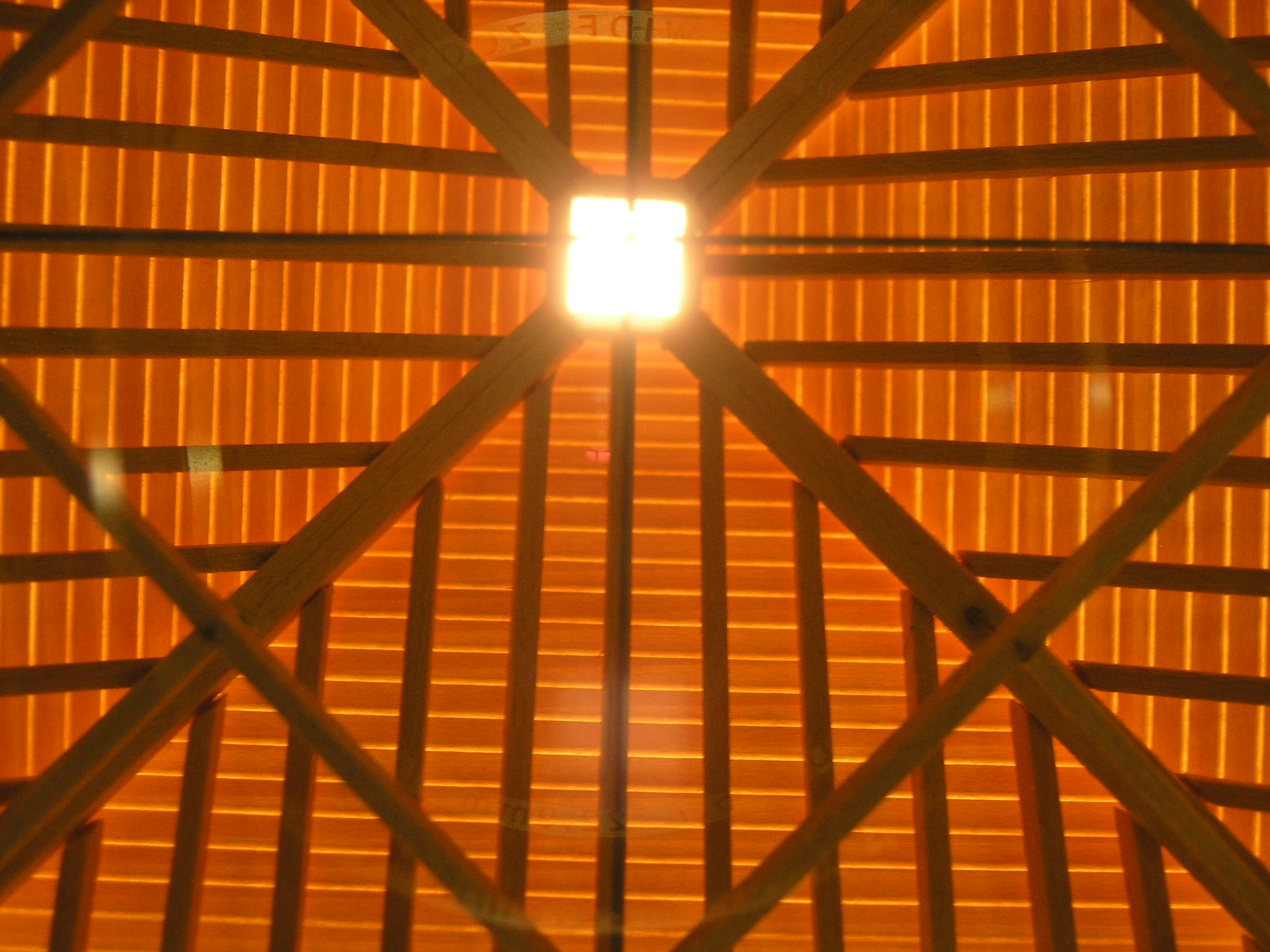
Oculus
