= My Architect =

2003 documentary film by Nathaniel Kahn

- Directed by: Nathaniel Kahn
- Written by: Nathaniel Kahn
- Produced by: Nathaniel Kahn; Susan Rose Behr
- Cinematography: Robert Richman
- Edited by: Sabine Krayenbühl
- Music by: Joseph Vitarelli
- Distributed by: New Yorker Films
- Release date: 2003
- Running time: 110 minutes
- Country: United States
- Language: English
- Box office: $2.9 million

My Architect: A Son's Journey is a 2003 documentary film about the American architect Louis Kahn (1901–1974), by his son Nathaniel Kahn, detailing the architect's extraordinary career and his familial legacy after his death in 1974.

In the film, Louis Kahn is quoted as saying “When I went to high school I had a teacher, in the arts, who was head of the department of Central High, William Grey, and he gave a course in Architecture, the only course in any high school I am sure, in Greek, Roman, Renaissance, Egyptian, and Gothic Architecture, and at that point two of my colleagues and myself realized that only Architecture was to be my life. How accidental are our existences are really, and how full of influence by circumstance.”

The film features interviews with renowned architects, including B. V. Doshi, Philip Johnson, Frank Gehry, Edmund Bacon (architect), Shamsul Wares, I.M. Pei, Moshe Safdie and Anne Tyng. Throughout the film, Kahn visits all of his father's buildings including The Yale Center for British Art, The Salk Institute, Jatiyo Sangshad Bhaban and the Indian Institute of Management Ahmedabad.

The film explores Kahn's family life which involved his fathering children by three different partners, each of whom was kept in the dark about the existence of his other families. Reviewing the film in Chicago Reader, David Schwartz wrote: "This absorbing, beautiful documentary is the first-person odyssey of Nathaniel Kahn, son of legendary architect Louis Kahn by one of his longtime mistresses. Despite his accomplishments, Kahn Sr. died a penniless loner in Penn Station in 1974, leaving behind three families, none of them aware of the others' existence. Seeking to unravel his father's mysterious personal life, Nathaniel combines rare personal footage and compelling interviews with the elder Kahn's colleagues, friends, and families."

== Release ==
HBO released My Architect to television.

== Reception ==
=== Critical response ===
My Architect has an approval rating of 93% on review aggregator website Rotten Tomatoes, based on 91 reviews, and an average rating of 7.57/10. The website's critical consensus states, "A moving and enlightening documentary about architect Louis Kahn". Metacritic assigned the film a weighted average score of 81 out of 100, based on 29 critics, indicating "universal acclaim".

=== Awards ===
My Architect was nominated for the 2003 Academy Award for Best Documentary Feature.
