= Nathaniel Kahn =

American filmmaker (born 1962)

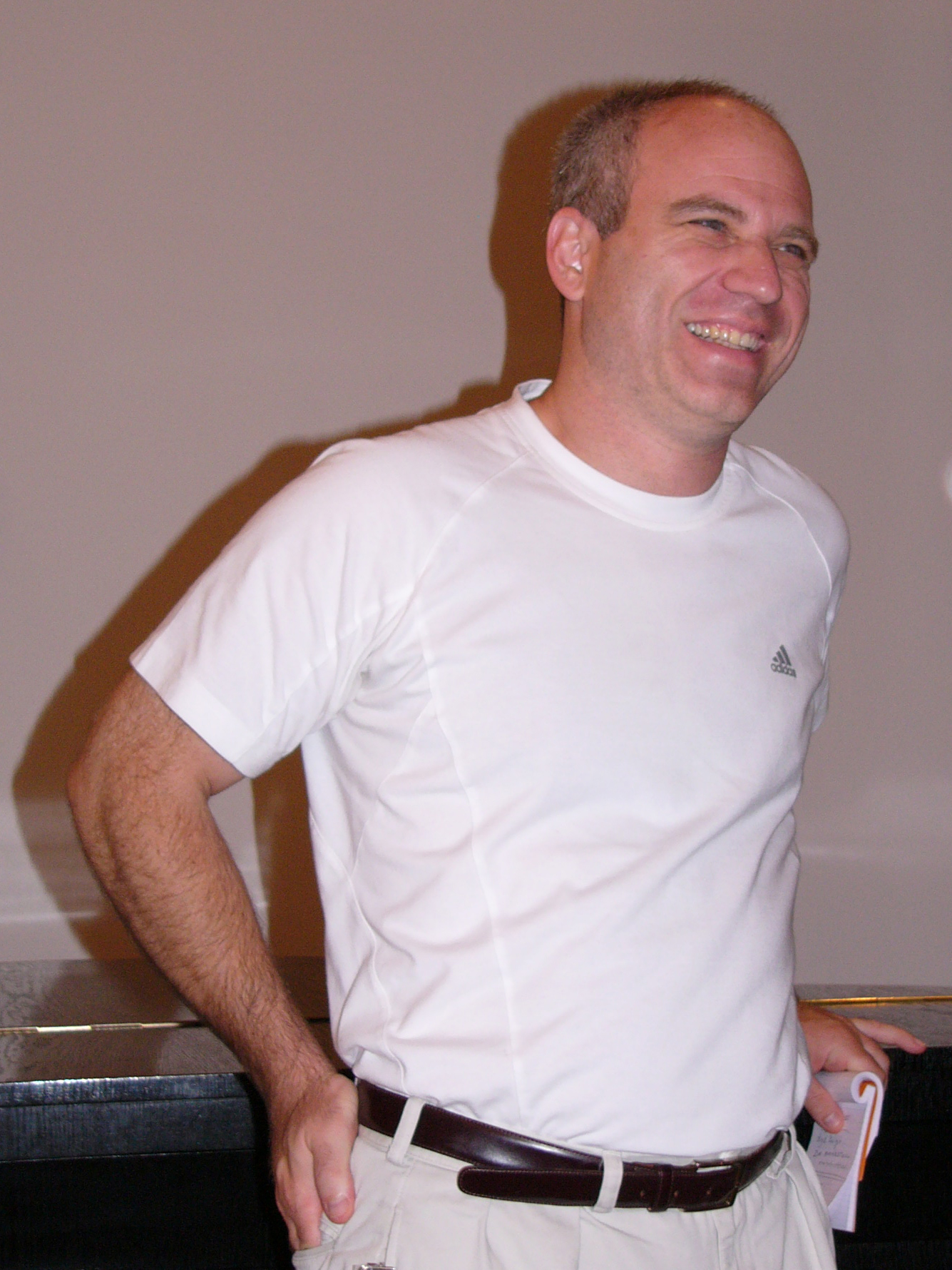
- Nathaniel Kahn in 2006
- Born: November 9, 1962 (age 63); Philadelphia, Pennsylvania
- Education: Yale University
- Occupation: Filmmaker
- Notable work: My Architect; Two Hands
- Parents: Louis Kahn (father); Harriet Pattison (mother)

Nathaniel Kahn (born November 9, 1962, in Philadelphia, Pennsylvania) is an American filmmaker. His documentaries My Architect (2003) – about his father, the architect Louis Kahn – and Two Hands (2006) were nominated for Academy Awards. His mother is landscape architect Harriet Pattison.

In 2018 Kahn directed the HBO documentary The Price of Everything about the exponential sums paid for works on the Contemporary art market. In 2023, he directed Deep Sky.

Kahn is a graduate of Germantown Friends School and Yale University.
