= Deaths in October 1992 =

The following is a list of notable deaths in October 1992.

Entries for each day are listed alphabetically by surname. A typical entry lists information in the following sequence:

- Name, age, country of citizenship at birth, subsequent country of citizenship (if applicable), reason for notability, cause of death (if known), and reference.

== October 1992 ==
=== 1 ===
- Gert Bastian, 69, German politician, murder-suicide.
- Ilgar Ismailov, 33, Azerbaijani soldier, killed in battle.
- Petra Kelly, 44, German politician, murder-suicide.
- Ali Mammadov, 37, Azerbaijani soldier and war hero, killed in action.
- Max Tera, 71, Indonesian cinematographer.
- Salvatore Valitutti, 85, Italian teacher and politician.

=== 2 ===
- Sabiha Bengütaş, 88, Turkish sculptor.
- Jug Bennett, 72, American football player (Green Bay Packers).
- Honnappa Bhagavathar, 77, Indian actor, musician and singer.
- Vincent Hallinan, 95, American lawyer.
- William Kennedy, 92, Canadian Olympic high jumper (1920).
- Ossy Parks, 77, Australian rules footballer.
- Luis Serra, 56, Uruguayan cyclist and Olympian (1952, 1956, 1960).
- Alfred Stefani, 66, Canadian Olympic rower (1948).
- Bogdan Suchodolski, 88, Polish philosopher and politician.

=== 3 ===
- Aliyar Aliyev, 34, Azerbaijani officer and war hero, killed in action.
- John Carisi, 70, American trumpeter and composer.
- Ted Dailey, 83, American gridiron football player (Pittsburgh Pirates).
- John William Davis, 76, American politician, member of the U.S. House of Representatives (1961–1975).
- Fritz Dennerlein, 56, Italian swimmer, water polo player and Olympian (1956, 1960, 1964), traffic collision.
- Lili Heglund, 88, Danish film actress.
- Peter Klein, 85, German opera singer.
- Marek Petrusewicz, 58, Polish swimmer and Olympian (1952).
- Ernest H. Volwiler, 99, American chemist.
- Ken Wilmshurst, 61, English long jumper, triple jumper and Olympian (1956).

=== 4 ===
- Zoltán Lajos Bay, 92, Hungarian physicist and engineer.
- Mohammed Benaziza, 33, French bodybuilder.
- Jack Hampstead, 72, Australian rugby league footballer.
- Denny Hulme, 56, New Zealand racing driver, heart attack.
- Augie Prudhomme, 89, American baseball player (Detroit Tigers).
- H. D. Thambiah, 65, Sri Lankan lawyer and judge.

=== 5 ===
- Sadhan Basu, 70, Indian physical chemist and academic.
- Cornelis Berkhouwer, 73, Dutch politician.
- Gösta Carlsson, 86, Swedish Olympic cyclist (1928).
- Eddie Kendricks, 52, American singer and songwriter, lung cancer.
- Fred Otash, 70, American private investigator and Hollywood fixer.
- Appa Sahib Pant, 80, Indian diplomat, writer and freedom fighter.
- Rosebud Yellow Robe, 85, Native American folklorist, educator, and author.

=== 6 ===
- Denholm Elliott, 70, English actor (Raiders of the Lost Ark, A Room with a View, Trading Places), BAFTA winner (1984, 1985, 1986), AIDS.
- Natalie Moorhead, 91, American film and stage actress.
- Bill O'Reilly, 86, Australian cricket player.
- Margit Symo, 79, Hungarian-German actress.

=== 7 ===
- Nikki Allan, 7, English murder victim
- Aina Berg, 90, Swedish Olympic swimmer (1920, 1924).
- Ed Blackwell, 62, American jazz drummer, kidney disease.
- Allan Bloom, 62, American philosopher, AIDS-related complications.
- Martin Eichler, 80, German number theorist.
- Joseph Kitagawa, 77, Japanese-American scholar in religious studies.
- Ted Kucharski, 85, American footballer (Providence Steam Roller).
- Bill Robinson, 73, English football player.
- Mikayil Useynov, 87, Azerbaijani architect.

=== 8 ===
- Robert Berdella, 43, American serial killer and rapist, congenital heart defect.
- Willy Brandt, 78, German politician, Chancellor (1969–1974), and Nobel Prize recipient (1971), colon cancer.
- Ian Graham Gass, 66, English geologist.
- Heinz Jenni, 41, Swiss Olympic ice hockey player (1972).
- Graziano Mancinelli, 55, Italian Olympic equestrian (1964, 1968, 1972, 1976, 1984).
- Lindsley Parsons, 87, American film producer and screenwriter.

=== 9 ===
- Doby Bartling, 79, American football player and coach.
- Saad El-Din El-Shorbagui, 72, Egyptian Olympic sports shooter (1952).
- Jędrzej Giertych, 89, Polish writer and politician.
- Johnny Gregory, 87, Australian rules footballer.
- Mike Guerra, 79, Cuban baseball player (Washington Senators, Philadelphia Athletics, Boston Red Sox).
- Harjinder Singh Jinda, 31, Indian Sikh separatist, execution by hanging.
- Ben Maddow, 83, American screenwriter and documentarian.
- Mary A. R. Marshall, 71, American politician, fall.
- Giuliano Ravizza, 66, Italian fashion designer, cancer.
- Sukhdev Singh Sukha, 30, Indian Sikh militant, execution by hanging.
- Per Olof Sundman, 70, Swedish writer.

=== 10 ===
- Sha Menghai, 92, Chinese great master of calligraphy.
- Woesha Cloud North, 74, Native American artist, teacher, and activist.
- James Seay, 78, American actor (The Life and Legend of Wyatt Earp, Death Valley Days, What Ever Happened to Baby Jane?).
- Zofia Wojciechowska-Grabska, 87, Polish painter.

=== 11 ===
- Ignatius Ghattas, 71, American Melkite Greek Catholic Church bishop.
- William Neufeld, 91, American track and field athlete and Olympian (1924).
- Froelich Rainey, 85, American anthropologist and academic.
- Josef Schilhab, 84, Austrian architect.
- Zakir Yusifov, 36, Azerbaijani soldier and war hero, killed in action.

=== 12 ===
- David Dragunsky, 82, Soviet army officer and politician.
- Severo Gomes, 68, Brazilian politician, helicopter crash.
- Ulysses Guimarães, 76, Brazilian politician, helicopter crash.
- John Hancock, 51, American actor (The Bonfire of the Vanities, City Heat, 10), heart attack.
- Eddy Kuijpers, 77, Dutch Olympic fencer (1948).
- Jim Percy, 43, Australian socialist politician, cancer.

=== 13 ===
- Tula Belle, 86, American child film actress.
- Jacques Delepaut, 66, French football player.
- Stan Livingstone, 79, Australian rules footballer.
- James Marshall, 50, American author (George and Martha, The Stupids), AIDS.
- Bob Mitchell, 74, American television writer.
- Les Pawson, 87, American marathon runner.
- Hughes Rudd, 71, American newscaster, aneurysm.
- Kiwako Taichi, 48, Japanese film actress, traffic collision.

=== 14 ===
- Qin Mu, 73, Chinese educator and writer.
- Poul Erik Petersen, 65, Danish football player and Olympian (1952).
- Anna Maria van Geene, 64, Dutch Olympic gymnast (1948).
- Frank Hose, 71, Australian rules footballer.
- Ralph Rose, 49, Australian rules footballer.
- William Waddell, 71, Scottish footballer.

=== 15 ===
- Gino Cavalieri, 97, Italian actor.
- Oliver Franks, Baron Franks, 87, English philosopher and diplomat.
- Jim Homer, 70, American basketball player (Syracuse Nationals).
- Talwinder Singh Parmar, 48, Indian militant and Canadian-Sikh terrorist, shot by police.
- Jackie Sullivan, 74, American Major League Baseball player (Detroit Tigers).
- Ezra Wyeth, 82, Australian cricketer.

=== 16 ===
- Shirley Booth, 94, American actress (Come Back, Little Sheba, The Year Without a Santa Claus, Hazel), Oscar winner (1953).
- Charley Burley, 75, American boxer.
- John Tracy Ellis, 87, American Catholic Church historian.
- Maurice Féaudierre, 90, French journalist and painter.
- Sayed Hamdi, 60, Egyptian Olympic gymnast (1952).
- Anna Hill Johnstone, 79, American costume designer (The Godfather, Ragtime, Dog Day Afternoon).
- Vijitha Mallika, 49, Sri Lankan actress, cancer.
- Antanas Poška, 89, Lithuanian traveler and anthropologist.
- William Edmond Robinson, 72, American politician.
- Vladek Sheybal, 69, Polish actor (From Russia with Love) and singer, aortic aneurysm.

=== 17 ===
- Edgar Chandler, 46, American gridiron football player (Buffalo Bills, New England Patriots).
- Brian Eaton, 75, Australian Air Force commander.
- Herman Johannes, 80, Indonesian politician and scientist.
- Orestis Laskos, 84, Greek film director, screenwriter and actor.
- John O'Connell, 88, American baseball player (Pittsburgh Pirates).
- Karomatullo Qurbonov, 30, Tajik singer, murdered.
- Prem Sahgal, 75, British Indian Army officer.
- Marcel Spilliaert, 67, French Olympic water polo player (1948).
- Rouben Ter-Arutunian, 72, American costume and scenic designer, lymphoma.
- Tadeusz Żmudziński, 68, Polish pianist.

=== 18 ===
- Yoram Ben-Porat, 55, Israeli academic and economist, traffic collision.
- Merl Condit, 75, American gridiron football player (Pittsburgh Steelers, Brooklyn Dodgers, Washington Redskins).
- Gerald Ellison, 82, English Anglican bishop.
- Albert Schwartz, 69, American zoologist.
- Alija Šuljak, 91, Bosnian Croatian war criminal during World War II.

=== 19 ===
- Atley Donald, 82, American baseball player (New York Yankees).
- Arturo Farías, 65, Chilean football player.
- Willie Lamothe, 72, Canadian musician.
- Maurice Le Roux, 69, French composer.
- Magnus Pyke, 83, English nutritional scientist and television presenter.
- Wulf Schmidt, 80, Danish-English double agent.
- James J. Stoker, 87, American mathematician and engineer.
- Alvin Stoller, 67, American jazz drummer.
- Arthur Wint, 72, Jamaican Olympic sprinter (1948, 1952).
- James Wykes, 79, English cricketer.

=== 20 ===
- Mimì Aylmer, 96, Italian actress.
- Orton Chirwa, 73, Malawian politician and political prisoner.
- Stanley McMaster, 66, Northern Irish Unionist politician.
- Koča Popović, 84, Yugoslav politician, vice president (1966–1967).
- Jack Reddish, 65, American Olympic alpine skier (1948, 1952).
- Werner Torkanowsky, 66, German conductor, cancer.
- Sam Vanni, 84, Finnish painter.
- Rudi Weissenstein, 82, Israeli photographer.
- Spider Wilhelm, 63, American baseball player (Philadelphia Athletics).

=== 21 ===
- Ante Ciliga, 94, Croatian politician and writer.
- Joe Dwyer, 89, American baseball player (Cincinnati Reds).
- Jim Garrison, 70, American attorney, cancer.
- François-Didier Gregh, 86, Monegasque politician and Minister of State.
- Bob Todd, 70, English comedy actor.

=== 22 ===
- Eric Ashby, Baron Ashby, 88, British botanist and educator.
- Red Barber, 84, American sportscaster.
- Carlo Bernari, 83, Italian author.
- Giorgio de Stefani, 88, Italian tennis player.
- Pavel Khristophorovich Dubinda, 78, Soviet Red Army war hero during World War II.
- Newell A. George, 88, American politician, member of the United States House of Representatives (1959-1961).
- Wilson Humphries, 64, Scottish football player and manager.
- Wolf Kaiser, 75, German theatre and film actor, suicide.
- Cleavon Little, 53, American actor (Blazing Saddles, Temperatures Rising, Purlie), Tony winner (1970), colon cancer.
- André Vandeweyer, 83, Belgian football player and coach.
- Ronald West, 78, British Olympic racewalker (1948).

=== 23 ===
- Alfred A. Arraj, 86, American district judge (United States District Court for the District of Colorado).
- Banine, 86, Azerbaijani-French writer.
- Dorothy Dunbar, 90, American actress and socialite.
- Jean Guinard, 93, French painter.
- Ernst Hartmann, 76, German medical doctor, author and publicist.
- William Masselos, 72, American classical pianist.
- Vernon Morgan, 88, English Olympic steeplechase athlete (1928).
- Lou Rochelli, 73, American baseball player (Brooklyn Dodgers).

=== 24 ===
- David Archer, 61, Barbadian cricket player and umpire.
- Laurie Colwin, 48, American writer, aortic aneurysm.
- Jack Indian, 66, Australian rules footballer.
- Mohammad Ibraheem Khwakhuzhi, 72, Afghan politician and writer.
- Gustav Kneip, 87, German composer.
- Jimmy Orlando, 76, Canadian ice hockey player.
- William Pietersz, 67, Colombian Olympic sports shooter (1956).
- Luis Rosales, 82, Spanish poet and essayist, cerebral hemorrhage.

=== 25 ===
- Adelino da Palma Carlos, 87, Portuguese politician, prime minister (1974).
- Arnold S. Eagle, 82–83, Hungarian-American photographer.
- Giorgio Locchi, 69, Italian journalist and writer.
- Karen Lykkehus, 88, Danish actress.
- Roger Miller, 56, American musician, lung cancer.
- Mehmet Reşat Nayır, 81, Turkish Olympic footballer (1936).
- Richard Pousette-Dart, 76, American abstract artist.
- Peter Rice, 57, Irish structural engineer, brain cancer.
- Ivan Svitlychny, 63, Ukrainian poet, literary critic, and Soviet dissident.

=== 26 ===
- Jerome Andrews, 83–84, American-French dancer and choreographer.
- Laurel Cronin, 53, American actress (A League of Their Own, Hook, Beethoven), cancer.
- Melvin Dixon, 42, American author and poet, AIDS.
- Paul Eisler, 85, Austrian inventor.
- Ridgely Gaither, 89, United States Army lieutenant general.
- Dottie Green, 71, American baseball player.
- Ron Reynolds, 76, Australian rules footballer.
- Giovanni Scotti, 81, Italian Olympic ice hockey player (1936).

=== 27 ===
- Ivan Andreadis, 68, Czechoslovak table tennis player.
- István Balogh, 80, Hungarian football player and manager.
- David Bohm, 74, American-British theoretical physicist, heart attack.
- Franz Fuchsberger, 82, Austrian Olympic footballer (1936).
- Paul Jessup, 84, American discus thrower, shot putter and Olympian (1932).
- Roy Marshall, 62, Barbadian-English cricket player, cancer.
- Josef Medřický, 84, Czech Olympic water polo player (1936).
- Nayyar Sultana, 55, Pakistani film actress, cancer.
- Wilson Whitley, 37, American football player (Cincinnati Bengals), heart problems.

=== 28 ===
- Hubert Benoit, 88, French psychotherapist.
- Greg Duhaime, 39, Canadian track and field athlete and Olympian (1984), AIDS-related complications.
- Charles Pellat, 78, Algerian-French academic, historian, and translator.
- Lin Shen, 84, Taiwanese politician.

=== 29 ===
- George T. Clemens, 90, American cinematographer.
- Manuel Antonio de Varona, 83, Cuban lawyer and politician.
- Kenneth MacMillan, 62, British ballet dancer, heart attack.
- Louis Marin, 61, French philosopher, historian, and art critic.

=== 30 ===
- Dionizije Dvornić, 66, Croatian football player.
- Ben Lessy, 90, American comedian and actor.
- Len Metherell, 83, Australian rules footballer.
- Joan Mitchell, 67, American artist, lung cancer.
- Joe Price, 64, Welsh cricketer.
- Kuladeivam Rajagopal, 61, Indian actor.

=== 31 ===
- Trevor Atkinson, 49, English football player.
- Jean Hébey, 76, French-Algerian film actor.
- Brian MacCabe, 78, English Olympic athlete (1936).
- Rikizo Takata, 92, Japanese painter.
- Sammy Ward, 28–29, Northern Irish paramilitary, killed by the IRA.
