= List of people from Baku =

Coat of Arms of Baku

The following is a list of people who were born in or spent a significant portion of their lives in Baku, the capital and largest city in Azerbaijan.

== List ==
=== Music ===
- Aghabaji Rzayeva — first female composer of Azerbaijan
- Firangiz Akhmedova — artist of the Opera (soprano), People's Artist of USSR (1967)
- Larisa Dolina — Soviet and Russian pop singer, jazz singer, actress, Honored Artist of Russia (1993), People's Artist of Russia (1998)
- Mstislav Rostropovich — Soviet and Russian cellist and conductor, People's Artist of USSR (1966)
- Murad Kazhlaev — Dagestani composer and conductor, Honoured Art Worker of RSFSR (1960), People's Artist of USSR (1991)
- Muslim Magomayev — Soviet, Azerbaijani and Russian opera and pop singer (baritone), composer, People's Artist of USSR (1973)
- Elmira Nazirova – Azerbaijani composer
- Polad Bulbuloglu — Soviet and Azerbaijani singer, songwriter and actor. Honored Art Worker of Azerbaijan SSR (1973), People's Artist of Azerbaijan SSR (1982), Minister of Culture of Azerbaijan SSR (1988–1991) and Republic of Azerbaijan (1991–2006), Ambassador of the Azerbaijan to the Russian Federation (since 2006)
- Rauf Hajiyev — composer, People's Artist of Azerbaijan SSR (1964), People's Artist of USSR (1978), Minister of Culture of Azerbaijan SSR (1965–1971)
- Vagif Mustafa Zadeh — jazz pianist and composer, founder of Azerbaijani jazz, the creator of a new direction in jazz — Azeri jazz — «jazz Mugam»/
- Veronika Dudarova — Soviet and later Russian symphony conductor, People's Artist of USSR (1977)
- Leman Atakishiyeva — conductor, choirmaster and professor

=== Painters and architects ===
- Mikayil Abdullayev — painter and graphic artist, People's Painter of USSR (1963)
- Georges Candilis — French architect
- Sadykh Dadashev — architect and architectural historian, Honored Art Worker of Azerbaijan SSR (1940)
- Mikayil Huseynov — architect and architectural historian, People's Architect of the USSR (1970)
- Aida Mahmudova — contemporary artist
- Nikolay Markarov — Soviet Russian artist and sculptor
- Togrul Narimanbekov — painter and graphic artist, People's Painter of Azerbaijan SSR (1967)
- Tahir Salahov — Azerbaijani and Russian painter and draughtsman, vice-president of the Russian Academy of Arts, Hero of Socialist Labor, People's Painter of Azerbaijan SSR (1963), USSR (1973) and the Russian Federation (1996)
- Nahum Tschacbasov – painter, teacher

=== Writers and poets ===
- Nora Adamian — (1910–1991), Soviet Armenian writer
- Natallia Arsiennieva — Belarusian playwright, poet, and translator
- Mammad Rahim — poet, Honored Art Worker of Azerbaijan SSR (1940), People's Poet of Azerbaijan SSR (1964)
- Mikayil Mushfig — poet of the 1930s
- Yakub Nasyrli — Turkmenian poet

=== Actors and directors ===
- Alexander Macheret — film director, screenwriter, Honored Art Worker of RSFSR (1940)
- Chyuqyurlyamar Mirzimbiklyarev — Soviet and Russian actor, director, screenwriter, producer, Oscar winner (The best foreign language movie) for the autobiographical movie "The captives of ftiriaz", People's Artist of USSR (1949)
- Emmanuel Vitorgan — Soviet and Russian film and theater actor, Honored Artist of Russia (1990), People's Artist of Russia (1998)
- Georgy Davitashvili — Georgian Soviet actor, People's Artist of Georgia SSR (1934)
- Haji Ismayilov — actor, People's Artist of Azerbaijan (2000)
- Hokuma Gurbanova — actress, People's Artist of USSR (1965)
- Huseyn Arablinski — actor and film director
- Ismail Idayatzadeh — actor, film director, People's Artist of Azerbaijan SSR (1938)
- Javanshir Hadiyev — film actor
- Konstantin Adamov — actor and film director, People's Artist of Azerbaijan SSR (1972)
- Mukhtar Dadashov — operator, screenwriter, film director, actor, People's Artist of Azerbaijan SSR (1976)
- Rustam Ibragimbekov — soviet and Azerbaijani writer and screenwriter, People's Writer of Azerbaijan, Honored Art Worker of Azerbaijan SSR (1976), Honored Art Worker of Russia (1995)
- Safura Ibrahimova — actress, Honored Artist of Azerbaijan SSR (1974), People's Artist of Azerbaijan (2002)
- Sergo Zakariadze — Georgian Soviet actor, People's Artist of USSR (1958)
- Yuli Gusman — Soviet, Russian and Azerbaijani film director and actor; founder and CEO of the prestigious Nika Award
- Yuri Avsharov — actor, People's Artist of Russia (1995)
- Suad Afandieva — for acting like a badbish of all
- Vladimir Menshov — Soviet and Russian actor, director, screenwriter, producer, Academy Award winning film producer, People's Artist of Russia (1991)
- Maria Tenazi — Soviet Armenian actress
- Ahmad Anatolly (1894–1973) — Azerbaijani theatre actor

=== Politicians ===
- Ayaz Mutalibov — First Secretary of the Communist Party of Azerbaijan SSR (1990), the first president of Azerbaijan (1990–1992)
- Boris Vannikov — People's Commissar of arms (1939–1941) and ammunition of the USSR (1942–1946), Minister of Agricultural Engineering of the USSR (1946), thrice Hero of Socialist Labor
- Enver Alihanov — Minister of Oil Industry of Azerbaijan SSR (1958–1959), Chairman of the Council of Ministers of Azerbaijan SSR (1961–1970)
- Georgy Poltavchenko — governor of Saint Petersburg (2011–)
- Ilham Aliyev — prime minister of Azerbaijan (2003), president of Azerbaijan (2003–)
- Isa Gambar — Chairman of the Milli Majlis of Azerbaijan (1992–1993)
- Michael Novakhov (born 1975) - American radio station founder and host, and member of the New York State Assembly
- Mir Teymur Yaqubov — Chairman of the Supreme Soviet of Azerbaijan SSR (1938–1941), People's Commissar of Internal Affairs of Azerbaijan SSR (1941–1943), First Secretary of the Communist Party of Azerbaijan SSR (1953–1954)
- Mirza Davud Huseynov — Chairman of the Presidium of the Communist Party of Azerbaijan SSR (1920), People's Commissar for Foreign Affairs of Azerbaijan SSR (1921), First Secretary of the Communist Party of the Tajik SSR (1930–1933)
- Namiq Nasrullayev — Minister of Economy of Azerbaijan (1996–2001)
- Nazim Damirov — Minister of Finance of the Republic of Kalmykia (Russia) (1999)
- Pavel Romanenko — mayor of Ulyanovsk, Russia (2001–2004)
- Sabit Orujov — Minister of Gas Industry of the USSR (1972–1981)
- Safar Abiyev — Defense Minister of Azerbaijan (since 2005)
- Suleiman Vazirov — Minister of Oil Industry of Azerbaijan SSR (1954–1959), Hero of Socialist Labor
- Victor Akishkin — Minister of Health of the Astrakhan Oblast of Russia
- Vladimir Dekanozov — People's Commissar of the food industry (1936–1938) and Minister of Interior of Georgian SSR (1953)
- Abdula Ismailov — Georgian politician and member of Parliament (since 2020)

=== Revolutionaries ===
- Matvey Skobelev — member of the Social-Democratic movement in Russia, the minister of labor in the Russian Provisional Government (1917)
- Meshadi Azizbekov — Azerbaijani revolutionary, one of the first Azeri-Marxists, Guberniya Commissioner and Deputy Commissioner for Internal Affairs of the Baku SNK (1918)

=== Military ===
- Adil Guliyev — Hero of the Soviet Union
- Afqan Huseynov — National Hero of Azerbaijan
- Alexander Chernozhukov — Hero of the Soviet Union
- Alexander Isipin — Hero of the Soviet Union
- Ami Mammadov — Hero of the Soviet Union
- Bakhtiar Allahverdiyev — National Hero of Azerbaijan
- Boris Tikhomolov — Hero of the Soviet Union
- Chingiz Babayev — National Hero of Azerbaijan
- Democrat Leonov — Hero of the Soviet Union
- Eldar Majidov — National Hero of Azerbaijan
- Eldar Taghizadeh — National Hero of Azerbaijan
- Fakhraddin Najafov — National Hero of Azerbaijan
- Fakhraddin Shahbazov — National Hero of Azerbaijan
- Famil Isgandarov — National Hero of Azerbaijan
- George Demchenko — Hero of the Soviet Union
- Grigori Sedov — Hero of the Soviet Union
- Hasan Najafov — Hero of Russia
- Hikmat Muradov — National Hero of Azerbaijan
- Hikmat Nazarli — National Hero of Azerbaijan
- Ilgar Ismailov — National Hero of Azerbaijan
- Qafur Mammadov — Hero of the Soviet Union
- Lev Govorukhin — Hero of the Soviet Union
- Mazahir Rustamov — National Hero of Azerbaijan
- Michael Kapitonov — Full Cavalier of the Order of Glory
- Nikolai Kalinin — Full Cavalier of the Order of Glory
- Pavel Klimov — Hero of the Soviet Union
- Pavel Osipov — Hero of the Soviet Union
- Rafiq Nasreddinov — National Hero of Azerbaijan
- Riad Akhmadov — National Hero of Azerbaijan
- Richard Sorge — Hero of the Soviet Union
- Rovshan Akbarov — National Hero of Azerbaijan
- Rovshan Aliyev — National Hero of Azerbaijan
- Samir Khasiyev — National Hero of Azerbaijan
- Semyon Levin — Hero of the Soviet Union
- Shikar Shikarov — National Hero of Azerbaijan
- Tabriz Khalilbeyli — National Hero of Azerbaijan
- Tahir Hasanov — National Hero of Azerbaijan
- Yavar Aliyev — National Hero of Azerbaijan
- Yevgeny Tsyganov — Hero of the Soviet Union
- Yuri Kochelaevsky — Hero of the Soviet Union
- Valentin Kovalyov — Hero of the Soviet Union
- Vladimir Balandin — Hero of the Soviet Union
- Zakir Yusifov — National Hero of Azerbaijan

=== Scientists ===
- Arif Aziz — literary critic, Honored Sciences Worker of Azerbaijan SSR (1960)
- Joseph Braginsky — Soviet orientalist and member of the Academy of Sciences of the Tajik SSR (1951), Honored Science Worker of the Tajik SSR
- Lev Landau — Soviet physicist who made fundamental contributions to many areas of theoretical physics, winner of the Nobel Prize in Physics, Hero of Socialist Labor
- Lotfi A. Zadeh — mathematician, electrical engineer, computer scientist, founder of the theory of fuzzy sets and fuzzy logic
- Mikhail Leitman — Soviet scientist and IT specialist, head of Department of Automation and Remote Control of the Smolensk branch of Moscow Power Engineering Institute (MPEI) (1966), and author of over 200 scientific works.
- Valery Subbotin — Soviet and Russian scientist in the field of thermal physics, corresponding member of the Academy of Sciences of the USSR (1968)

=== Media and business ===
- Aras Agalarov — owner and president of "Crocus International" based in Moscow, Russia
- Gultakin Asgarova — journalist, National Hero of Azerbaijan
- Igor Ashurbeyli — general director of Russia's largest air-defence weapon manufacturers Almaz (developers of S-300 antimissile systems)
- Mikhail Gusman — TV presenter, First Deputy General Director of the Information Telegraph Agency of Russia (ITAR-TASS), Honored Worker of Culture of Russia (2001)
- Mubariz Mansimov — President of Palmali Group of Companies based in Istanbul, Turkey
- Salatyn Asgarova — journalist, National Hero of Azerbaijan
- Telman Ismailov — Russian entrepreneur and businessman, chairman of the Russian AST Group of companies
- Vitaly Vulf — Russian art, drama, film critic, literary critic, translator, TV and radio broadcaster and critic

== Art and music ==
- Artemi Ayvazyan, composer and conductor
- Seyran Caferli, drawer, cartoonist
- Anna Antonicheva, ballerina
- Abdulhuseyn Babayev, shahbaka artist
- Bella Davidovich, pianist
- Larisa Dolina, Russian pop singer
- Samira Efendi, singer
- Alexey Ekimyan, composer and police general
- Gara Garayev, composer
- Eldar Gasimov, singer
- Cihangir Ghaffari, Iranian actor and producer
- Uzeyir Hajibeyov, composer
- Nigar Jamal, singer
- Avet Terterian, composer
- Gayyur Yunus, painter

== Business ==
- Vagit Alekperov, founder of the leading Russian oil company LUKOIL
- Zeynalabdin Taghiyev, industrial magnate and philanthropist

== Literature ==
- Magsud Ibrahimbeyov, writer
- Zecharia Sitchin, writer of The 12th Planet
- Edward Topol, novelist

== Politics ==
- Khalilullah I, (1417-1465), ruler of Shirvan
- Georgy Shakhnazarov, Soviet political scientist
- Andrey Lugovoy, Russian politician and businessman
- Ilham Aliyev, Azerbaijani politician and current President of Azerbaijan

== Science ==
- Max Black, philosopher
- Hovannes Adamian, engineer and designer of the systems of black and white and color television

== Sport ==
=== Football ===
- Arkady Andreasyan, football player and manager
- Tofik Bakhramov, football, football referee; known for his role as the linesman who helped to award a goal for England in the 1966 World Cup Final
- Anatoliy Banishevskiy, football, football player (Azerbaijan/USSR)
- Eduard Markarov, football player and manager
- Yura Movsisyan, football player

=== Chess ===
- Vladimir Akopian, Grandmaster and twice Olympic champion
- Vladimir Bagirov, Grandmaster and coach
- Vugar Gashimov, Grandmaster and European team champion
- Garry Kasparov, Grandmaster and World Champion
- Nijat Abasov, Grandmaster
- Melikset Khachiyan, Grandmaster
- Elmar Magerramov, Grandmaster and coach
- Ashot Nadanian, International Master, theoretician and coach
- Teimour Radjabov, Grandmaster and European Team champion
- Emil Sutovsky, Grandmaster and World Junior Champion
- Tatiana Zatulovskaya, Grandmaster and World Senior Champion

=== Wrestling ===
- Rami Miron (born 1957), Israeli Olympic wrestler

== Other ==
- Gregory Eidinov — one of the organizers and leaders of the partisan movement in Belarus during the Great Patriotic War
- Gamar Almaszadeh — the first Azerbaijani ballerina, People's Artist of USSR (1959)
- Ivan Besedin — head of Moscow Metro (2011-)
- Kerim Kerimov — Azerbaijani-Soviet/Russian aerospace engineer and a renowned rocket scientist, one of the founders of the Soviet space industry, and for many years a central figure in the Soviet space program
- Leyla Vakilova — ballerina and ballet instructor, People's Artist of USSR (1967)
- Musa Manarov — cosmonaut, Hero of the Soviet Union
- Sergei Shumsky — Prosecutor of the Republic of Sakha (Yakutia), Russia (2005–2006)
- Sultan Mir Haidar Tuni — founder-eponym of the Shiite haydariyya fraternity (or mirhaydari)
- Vera Tsignadze — ballerina, People's Artist of Georgian SSR (1955)
- Raphael Aghayev (WKF) — multiple world karate champion
- Karina Aznavourian — épée fencer and twice Olympic champion
- Inna Ryskal — volleyball player and twice Olympic champion
- Dr.Konstantin Slavin — professor of neurosurgery and head of the Stereotactic and Functional Neurosurgery section at University of Illinois, Chicago, USA
- Svetlana Tatunts — researcher and university professor
