= Ron Reynolds =

Ron Reynolds may refer to:

- Ron Reynolds (politician) (born 1973), American disbarred lawyer and member of the Texas House of Representatives
- Ron Reynolds (footballer, born 1928) (1928–1999), English football goalkeeper
- Ron Reynolds (Australian footballer) (1916–1992), Australian rules footballer

== See also ==
- Ronn Reynolds (born 1958), American baseball catcher
