= Shusha Global Media Forum =

Annual conference in Shusha, Azerbaijan

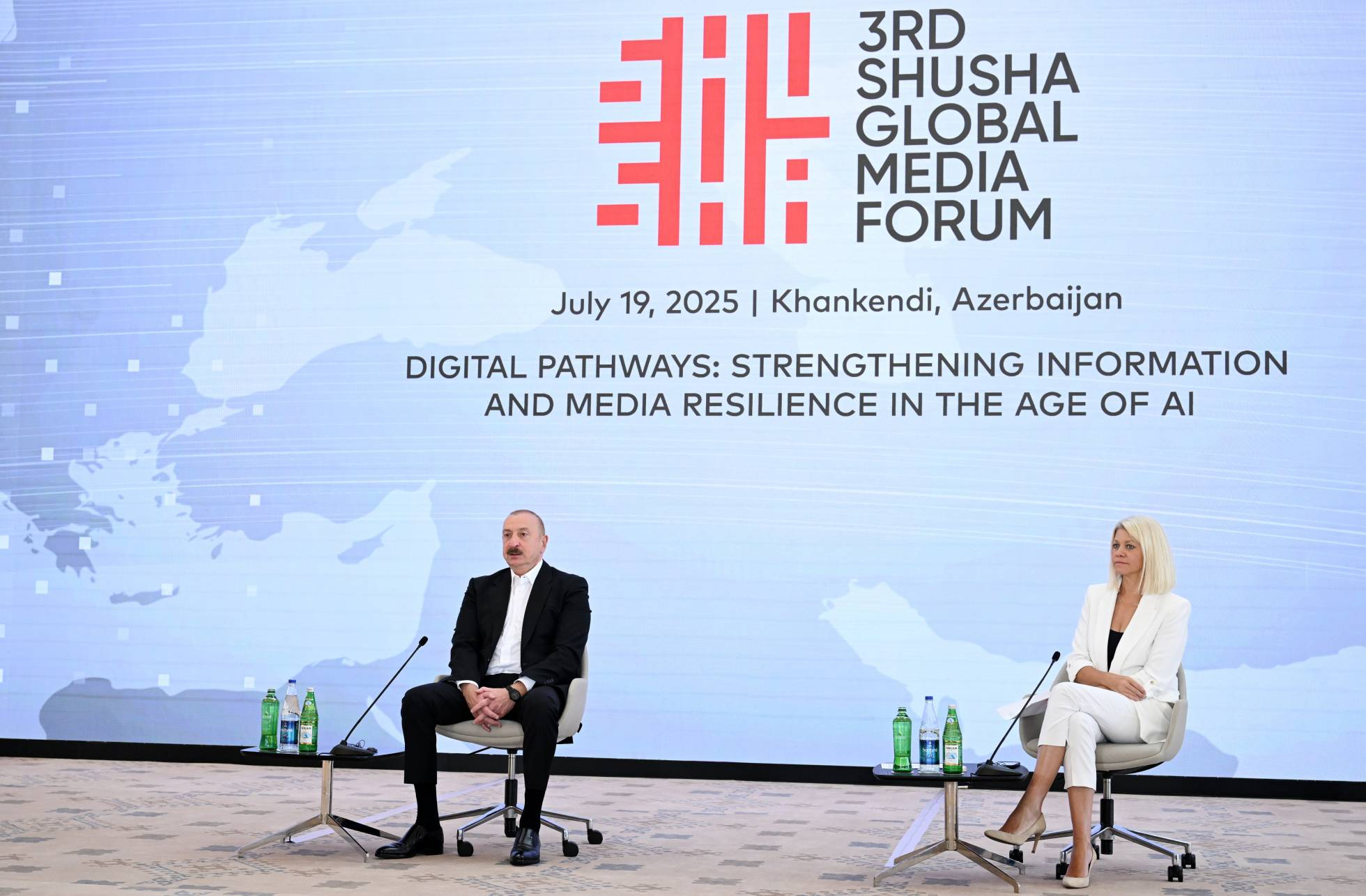
- President of Azerbaijan Ilham Aliyev addresses participants at the 3rd Shusha Global Media Forum
- Formation: 2023
- Type: Panel forum
- Legal status: Non-profit foundation
- Purpose: Diplomacy
- Location: Shusha, Azerbaijan
- Region served: Worldwide
- Methods: Host conferences and meetings
- Official language: English

The Shusha Global Media Forum (SMF) is an annual conference on media that is held in Shusha, Azerbaijan since 2022. During the forum, ideas and views on media, diplomacy, and policy are exchanged by journalists, policy makers, and diplomats.

The meeting brings together some 160 participants from 54 countries for up to three days to discuss global media issues across several sessions.

== History ==
The Shusha Global Media Forum was established in 2023 by the Government of Azerbaijan as an international platform for dialogue on the future of journalism, media innovation, digital transformation, and global information security. The forum is organised by the Media Development Agency of the Republic of Azerbaijan (MEDIA) and brings together journalists, media executives, academics, policymakers, and representatives of international organisations.

The inaugural forum was held in Shusha from 21–23 July 2023 under the theme "New Media in the Era of the Fourth Industrial Revolution". More than 150 participants from nearly 50 countries discussed the impact of artificial intelligence, digital technologies, media sustainability, and international cooperation in journalism. During the forum, participants also visited reconstruction projects in territories affected by the Nagorno-Karabakh conflict.

The second Shusha Global Media Forum took place from 20–22 July 2024 under the theme "Exposing False Information: Confronting Disinformation". Discussions focused on combating fake news, strengthening media resilience, ethical standards in journalism, and international collaboration against information manipulation. The event attracted several hundred participants representing dozens of countries.

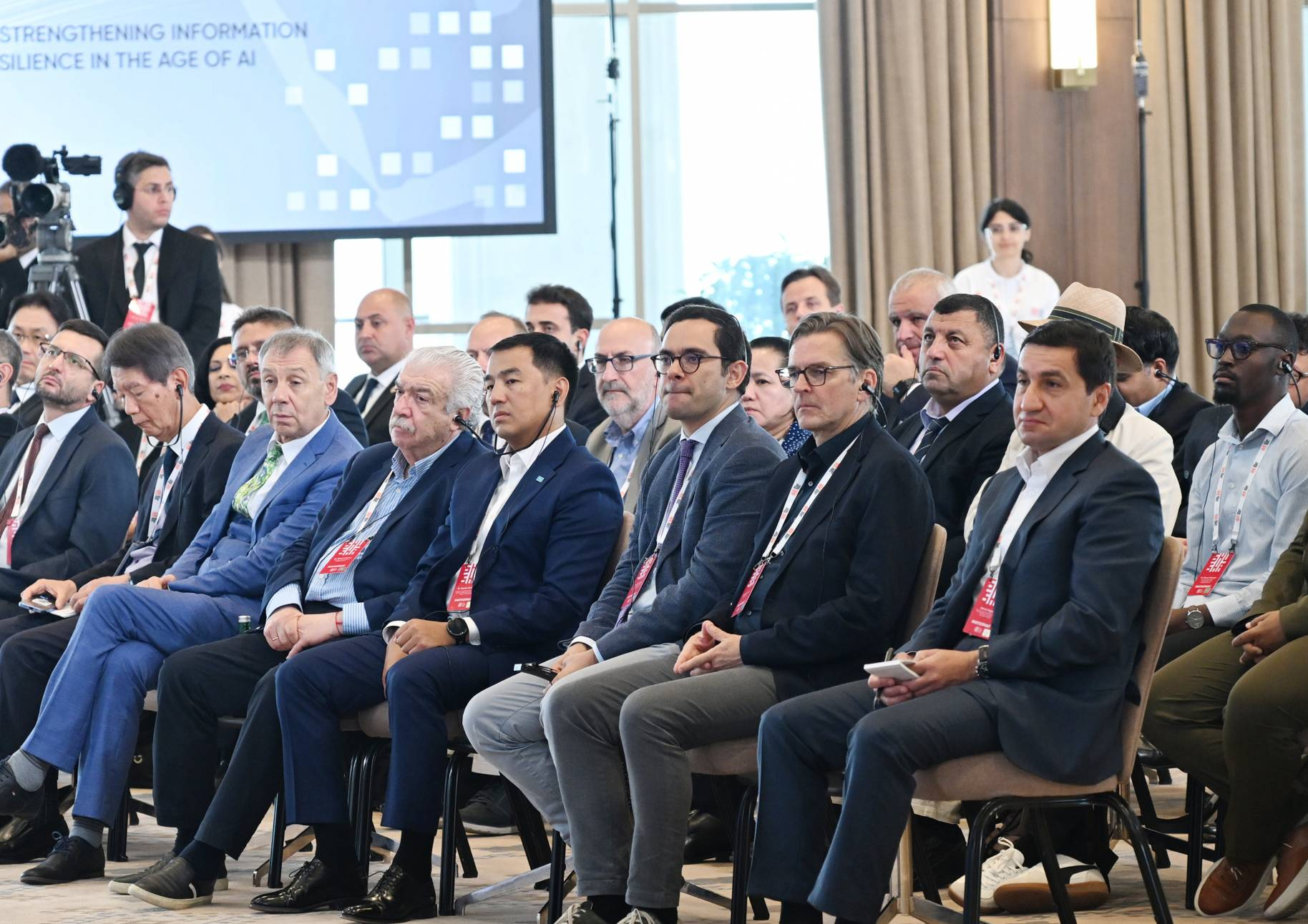
Sergei Markov with Mikhail Gusman at the Shusha Global Media Forum

The forum received international attention after several participants faced repercussions in Russia. On 25 July 2025, Russian Prime Minister Mikhail Mishustin dismissed Mikhail Gusman as First Deputy Director-General of the state-owned news agency TASS. In August 2025, Russian political analyst Sergei Markov, who had attended the forum, was designated a "foreign agent" by Russia's Ministry of Justice.

The third forum was held from 19–21 July 2025 under the theme "Digital Pathways: Strengthening Information and Media Resilience in the Age of AI". Sessions examined the growing influence of artificial intelligence on journalism, cybersecurity, media literacy, and the future of digital communication. Delegates also participated in visits to reconstruction projects in Shusha and surrounding areas.

The fourth Shusha Global Media Forum was held from 19–21 July 2026 under the theme "The Mission of the Media in Promoting Peace". The event focused on the role of journalism in conflict prevention, peacebuilding, and responsible reporting. Discussions covered artificial intelligence, the evolving information environment, ethical challenges facing global media, and international cooperation. The programme included visits to reconstruction projects in Shusha, Khojaly and Khankendi, highlighting post-conflict redevelopment efforts.

Since its inception, the Shusha Global Media Forum has become an annual international gathering for discussions on contemporary challenges facing the media industry, with a particular emphasis on technological change, information security, media ethics, and international dialogue. It has also served as a platform for showcasing Azerbaijan's post-conflict reconstruction and development initiatives in the Karabakh region.

== Purpose ==
The Shusha Global Media Forum was established to provide an international platform for dialogue on the future of journalism, media policy, and digital communications. It seeks to bring together journalists, media executives, academics, policymakers, technology experts, and representatives of international organisations to discuss contemporary challenges facing the global media industry.

The forum aims to promote international cooperation in journalism, encourage the exchange of professional experience and best practices, and examine issues including media ethics, press freedom, digital transformation, artificial intelligence, disinformation, cybersecurity, and information resilience. It also serves as a venue for discussions on the role of the media in conflict reporting, peacebuilding, and sustainable development.

In addition to its professional agenda, the forum enables participants to visit Shusha and other parts of the Karabakh region, where they are introduced to cultural heritage sites and post-conflict reconstruction projects. Organisers describe the event as an opportunity to foster dialogue between international media professionals while highlighting developments in the region.

== Participants ==
Among the notable participants over the years are:

Azerbaijan

- Hikmat Hajiyev
- Ilham Aliyev
- Nigar Arpadarai

Germany

- Claus Strunz

Jordan

- Montaser Marai

Kazakhstan

- Aqtoty Raiymqulova

Lebanon

- Ghida Fakhry

Russia

- Mikhail Gusman
- Sergei Markov

Ukraine

- Dmitry Gordon

United States

- Andrea Sanke
- Charles Veley

== See also ==
- Doha Forum
- Munich Security Conference
- Raisina Dialogue
- Shangri-La Dialogue
- Valdai Discussion Club
