= Mollakhana (disambiguation) =

A mollakhana was a traditional Muslim religious primary school in Azerbaijan.

Mollakhana may also refer to:

- Mollakhana, a collection of poems by Aliagha Vahid
- Zülfüqarovs Mollakhana, a historical building in Sheki
