= Abdulhuseyn Babayev =

Azerbaijani woodworker, shabaka artisan

- Born: 1877; Baku, Baku Governorate, Russian Empire
- Died: 1961 (aged 83–84); Baku, Azerbaijan SSR, USSR
- Known for: carpenter, shabaka artist
- Awards: Honored Art Worker of the Azerbaijan SSR

Abdulhuseyn Karbalayi Mikayil oghlu Babayev (Azerbaijani: Əbdülhüseyn Kərbəlayı Mikayıl oğlu Babayev, 1877 — 1961) was an Azerbaijani carpenter, shabaka artist, Honored Art Worker of the Azerbaijan SSR.

== Biography ==
Abdulhuseyn Babayev was born in 1877 in Baku. After leaving the mollakhana (Muslim religious primary school) where he studied, he started working as an apprentice for 10 years, and learned to make doors and windows and work with glassed gallery. Later, for nearly a decade, he worked for the shipping company Caucasus and Mercury, where he fastened hundreds of wheels.

A. Babayev, who learned how to make a rahil (wooden book stand) at a young age, was able to cut from the simplest tower rahil, to six to eight towered rahil. He tried to innovate in the rahils he made without nails and glue, sometimes cutting two rahils inside each other, and sometimes making a rahil that could be molded into several shapes of eight or more parts. His rahil works are displayed in Azerbaijani museums.

Shabakas called "Jafari", "Khab-bidar", "Eight towers", "Sixteen towers" took an important place in the works of Abdulhuseyn Babayev. He created shabaka compositions for the Museum of Azerbaijani Literature, the Museum of History of Azerbaijan, the pavilion of the Azerbaijan SSR at the Exhibition of National Economic Achievements (Moscow, 1939). A. Babayev memorized shabaka ornaments, applied various patterns on the partitions, door and window shabakas, as well as furniture decorations, and often included various ornamental elements in the same shabaka composition.

Abdulhuseyn Babayev headed a shabaka workshop at the Azerbaijan State Art School for several years. His students Asaf Jafarov, Mirzaagha Gafarov, Amil Salamov studied this art and created various shabaka compositions.

A. Babayev died in 1961 in Baku. People's Artist of the USSR Mikayil Abdullayev completed the portrait of "Centennial Master Abdulhuseyn Babayev" dedicated to the master of the shabaka in 1961, and this work was exhibited in various countries and kept in the Tretyakov Gallery.

== Awards ==
- Honored Art Worker of the Azerbaijan SSR — January 5, 1957
- Medal "For the Defence of the Caucasus"
- Medal "For Valiant Labour in the Great Patriotic War 1941–1945"
