= House of Haji Amir =

Historic building in Shusha, Azerbaijan

House of Haji Amir Hacı Əmirin evi

General information
- Location: Tabrizli neighbourhood, Shusha, Azerbaijan
- Completed: XVIII century

Technical details
- Floor count: 2

House of Haji Amir (Azerbaijani: Hacı Əmirin evi) is a historical-architectural monument built by the merchant Haji Amir in the middle of the 18th century, located in the Tabrizli neighbourhood of Shusha city.

== About ==
On the first floor of a two-story residential building there are service and partial residential rooms, and on the second floor there are living rooms and bedrooms. However, on the second floor, instead of the loggia, which is traditional for Shusha houses, it has an open balcony located in the same facade line as the house.

An open staircase built into the facade of the house leads to the balcony. It is possible to pass from the balcony to a small passage room. The door opens from that room to two rooms located on the sides. From one of those two rooms, which was used as a bedroom, a latticed window opens to the inner courtyard of the house. The walls and ceiling of another room designed for welcoming guests are decorated with fresco paintings.

== Sources ==
- Авалов, Э. В. (1977). Архитектура города Шуши и проблемы сохранения его исторического облика. Баку: Элм.
- Саркисов, А. В.; Ализаде, А. М. (1950). О некоторых архитектурных памятниках Шуши (Памятники архитектуры Азербайджана (сборник материалов), т. II ed.). Москва-Баку.
- Саламзаде, А. В. (1964). Архитектура Азербайджана XVI-XIX вв. Баку.
