= Maryse Choisy =

French writer & journalist (1903–1979)

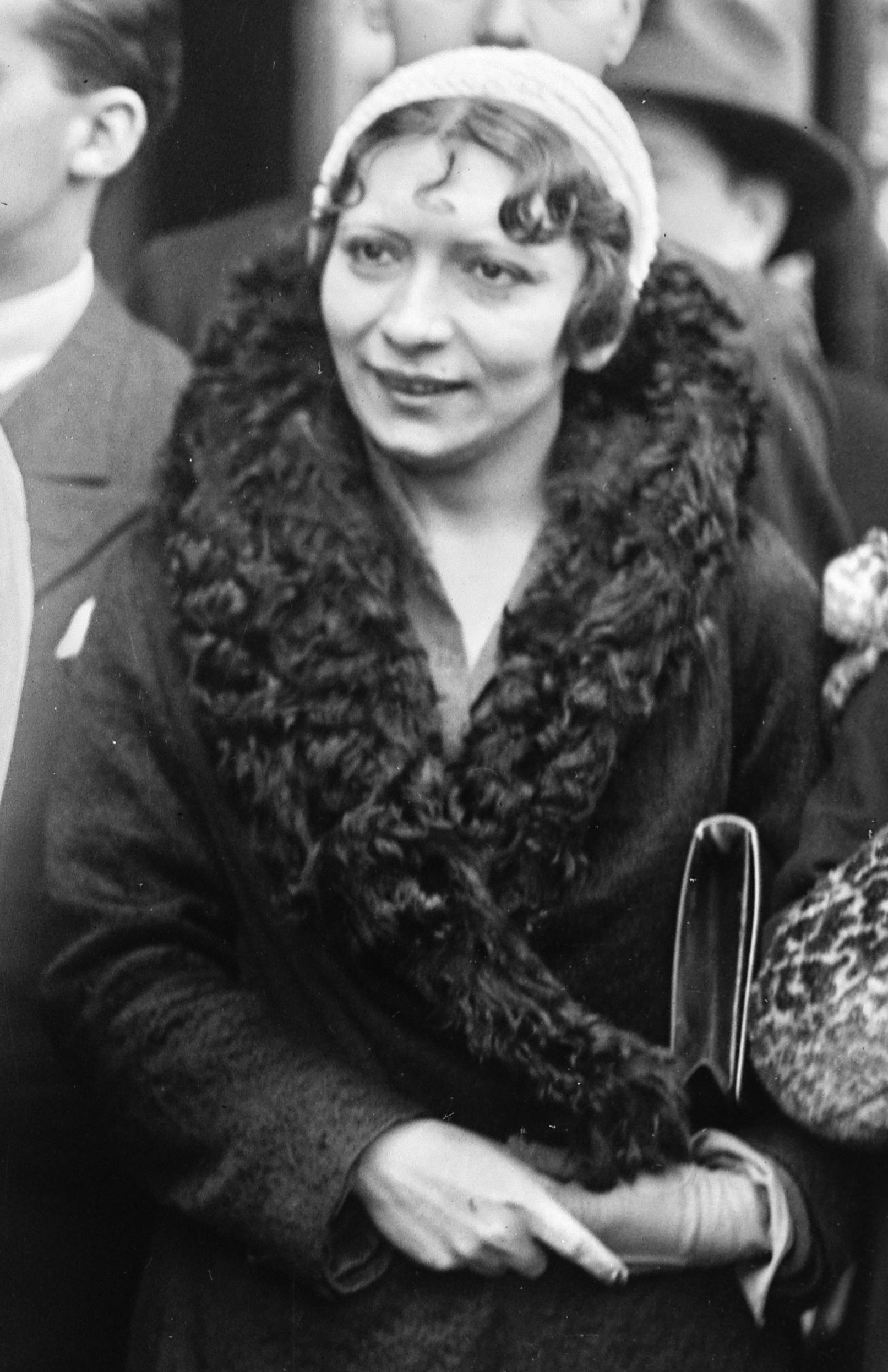
Maryse Choisy in 1931

Maryse Choisy (1903–1979) was a French philosophical writer, journalist and founder of the journal Psyché.

== Biography ==
Born in Saint-Jean-de-Luz on 1 February 1903, she was brought up by her rich aunts in a historical castle in the Basque country. After the end of the First World War, she went to study at Girton College, part of the University of Cambridge.

In 1927, she sought psychoanalytical treatment from Sigmund Freud and upon recounting an anxiety dream to him Freud apparently concluded, correctly, that she had been an illegitimate child.

=== Visit to Mount Athos ===
In 1929, Maryse Choisy undertook a secret journey to Mount Athos, disguising herself as a sailor in order to study monastic life and observe the daily routines of the monks. Her entry violated the avaton, the centuries-old ban on the presence of women on the peninsula, and sparked controversy at the time. She later recounted her experience in her book Un mois chez les hommes (“A Month with Men”), published in 1930.

Choisy was a critic of André Breton's Surrealist Manifesto saying that it was based on a misunderstanding of Freud's concept of the unconscious mind and as a response to the Surrealist Movement, she published her "Manifeste Surridealiste" in Les Nouvelles littéraires on 22 October 1927. It can also be found in her novel Mon Coeur dans une formule: C6 H8 (Az O3)6.

Between 1935 and 1937, Maryse Choisy founded and directed three journals of occultism: Votre Bonheur (Your Happiness), Votre Destin(Your Destiny) and Consolation.

It seems that, later, she does not wish to dwell on this period of her life. What she says about it in her memoirs is succinct:—

“I created an esoteric weekly: Your Happiness, then Consolation . Henri Bergson gave me a brilliant article for the first issue. Each newspaper has its peak and its decline. After some time I saw myself surrounded by little magi who dreamed of Faustian adventures. They evoked an angel whose name ended in ael and were astonished that he broke dishes. After Peladan I discovered that it was dangerous to associate with alchemists and groups of occultists without being attached to some true and great Church. [...] "( On the way to God we first meet the devil, p.329)

After meeting Pierre Teilhard in 1938 she converted to Catholicism and began to connect science, religion and psychoanalysis in her work. Her role in the founding of the journal Psyché (1946) reflected her concerns with the "ideals of the Roman Catholic church". She went back to receiving psychoanalysis from René Laforgue in this period.

Her most controversial work was Un mois chez les filles which literally means 'A month among the girls' however when it was published in 1961 in English in the United States the titled changed to Psychoanalysis of the Prostitute. Choisy attempted to characterise sex workers as more human than in previous literature and avoided "moralising or...aestheticism".

She received multiple awards in her lifetime including the National Order of Merit, a silver medal of Arts, Lettres, et Sciences, and the Lamennais Prize in 1967.

== Partial bibliography ==
- Presque… [Almost...], quasi-novel. Éditeurs associés, 1923.
- La Chirologie [Palm Reading]. Alcan, 1927.
- Mon cœur dans une formule [My Heart in a Formula].
- Cahiers suridéalistes [Suridealist Notebooks].
- Un mois chez les filles [A Month With the Girls]. Montaigne, 1928.
- Un mois chez les Hommes [A Month With the Guys]. Éditions de France, 1929.
- Delteil tout nu [Delteil Naked]. Montaigne, 1930.
- Le Vache à l’âme [The Soul Cow]. Éditions du Tambourinaire, 1930.
- Quand les bêtes sont amoureuses [When Beasts are in Love]. Édition des portiques, 1931.
- La guerre des sexes [The War of the Sexes] (? - reissued in 1970).
- L'Amour dans les prisons [Love in the Prisons]. Montaigne, 1930.
- Le thé des Romanech [The Tea of the Romanech]. 1943.
- Yoga et psychanalyse [Yoga and Psychoanalysis]. Mont Blanc, 1948.
- Qu’est-ce que la psychanalyse ? [What is Psychoanalysis ?]. L’Arche, 1950.
- Problèmes sexuels de l'adolescence [Sexual Problems of Adolescence]. Montaigne, 1954.
- Sigmund Freud: A New Appraisal. The Citadel Press, 1963.
- Sur le chemin de Dieu on rencontre d’abord le diable [On the Way to God You Meet the Devil First]. Memoirs, 1925–1939. Émile Paul, 1977.
- Contes pour ma fille... et pour les autres [Tales for My Little Girl...And for the Others] (article in French).
