= Les Nouvelles littéraires =

French literary and artistic newspaper (1922–1985)

- Editor: Éditions Larousse
- Categories: Literature
- Frequency: Weekly
- Founded: 1922
- Final issue: 1985
- Country: France
- Based in: Paris

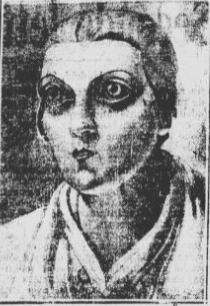
Drawing by Adrienne Monnier in issue 187 of the Les Nouvelles Littéraires on 15 May 1926

Les Nouvelles littéraires was a French literary and artistic newspaper created in October 1922 by the Éditions Larousse. It disappeared in 1985 after having taken the title L'Autre Journal.

== History ==
Les Nouvelles littéraires were headed by Maurice Martin du Gard from 1922 to 1936 then by André Gillon, and then his son Étienne Gillon. René Minguet was its director from 1971 to 1975 followed by Philippe Tesson from 1975 to 1983.

The editors were successively Gilbert Charles, Frédéric Lefèvre from 1922 until 1949, Georges Charensol from 1949 to 1962, and André Bourin until its disestablishment in 1985.

The magazine, at first artistic and literary, became interested in cinema and science afterwards. It ceased publication from 1940 until 1945. In 1924, the newspaper published an appendix entitled L'Art vivant.

== Some collaborators ==
- Raymond Woog
- Jean-Louis Ezine
- Michel Field
- Jeanne Cressanges
- Pierre Billard
- Pierrette Micheloud
- Pascal Mérigeau
- Maurice Féaudierre
- Madeleine Masson
- Maryse Choisy

== Sources ==
- 1973: D'une rive à l'autre, Georges Charensol, Mercure de France, ISBN 2715209983
- 2006: Gavroche, André Demonsais, L'Harmattan, series des poings et des roses
