= Jules Comte =

French art historian and government official (1846–1912)

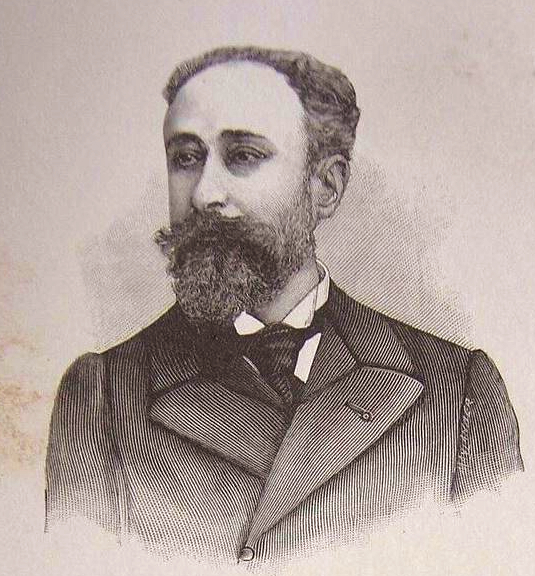
Jules Comte, by Charles-Georges Maylander

Jules Victor Abel Eugène Jean Comte (17 October 1846, Paris – 14 December 1912, Paris) was a French art historian and government official.

== Life and work ==
He studied at the Lycée Bonaparte (now the Lycée Condorcet), and was hired by the Ministry of State in 1866.

In 1881, he was appointed Inspector General of the fine arts schools. Five years later, he was named Director of civic buildings, in charge of the headquarters of what is now the Ministry of National Education. From that time, through 1901, he was involved in expanding the Bibliothèque Nationale. He also participated in restoration projects at the Château de Versailles, and the Domaine national de Saint-Cloud.

He was awarded the rank of Commander in the Legion of Honor in 1895. The following year, he founded the Revue de l'art ancien et moderne, which passed to Raymond Woog upon his death.

He was elected to the Académie des Beaux-Arts in 1909, where he took Seat #2 in the "Unattached" section; succeeding Émile Michel (deceased).

== Publications ==
- Jules Comte, Tapisserie de Bayeux avec planches, J. Rothschild, 1878 OCLC 864117605

== Sources ==
- Biographical data and references from the Comité des travaux historiques et scientifiques @ La France Savante
- Detailed biography @ the Institut National d'Histoire de l'Art
