= Raymond Woog =

French painter

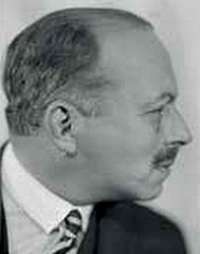
Raymond Woog (c.1930)

Raymond Emmanuel Woog (25 October 1875, Paris - 10 May 1949, Neuilly-sur-Seine) was a French painter, designer and illustrator.

== Biography ==
He was a student of Gustave Moreau at the École des Beaux-Arts. In 1903, he was one of the exhibitors at the first Salon d'Automne, where he received critical praise from Arsène Alexandre. Two years later, he married Violette Julie Picard (1882–1968), whose father was a businessman. They had four daughters.

In 1912, following the death of Jules Comte, founder of the Revue de l'art ancien et moderne, Woog took over as provisional manager of the publication. This was interrupted in 1914, at the beginning of World War I. The following year, he was inducted, and spent six months in Flanders. Upon being promoted to Lieutenant, he was posted as an attaché to the British Army. His sketches of English and French soldiers were published in 1916, as 32 plates in a canvas portfolio. It was a limited edition of 150 copies, with the title "Passed by Censor". He was mustered out early in 1918.

He began his career as an illustrator with a cover for the novel, Les Silences du colonel Bramble, by André Maurois, who also served with British troops during the war. Woog is said to have been the inspiration for the novel's narrator, "Aurelle", a French interpreter. This served as his entry into the milieu of the press, where he became a good friend of the journalist, Pierre Mille. He would soon be a recognized illustrator for several publications.

In 1928, he travelled to New York, for an exhibition of his works at the Jacques Seligmann gallery. Curiously, his reputation in the United States appears to have been based on his portraits of children. He did, in fact, perform several such commissions while there, but also painted portraits of notable people, such as Maurice Ravel. From 1933 to 1934, he was a regular collaborator with Les Nouvelles littéraires.

He made many long stays in Seine-et-Marne, where he specialized in painting flowers; a theme he would return to when he retired in 1940 and settled in Crest. He was named a Knight in the Legion of Honor in 1947.

== Selected paintings ==
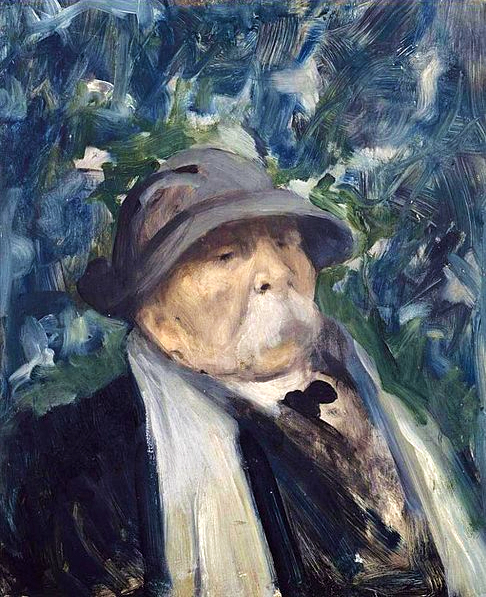
Georges Clemenceau (c.1925)

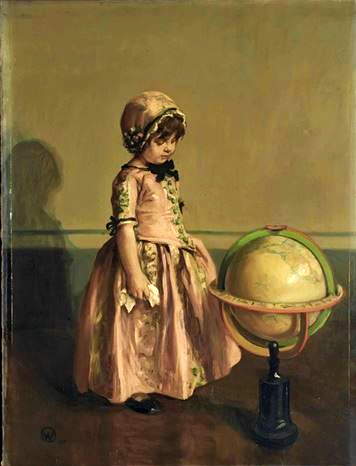
Infant with Globe

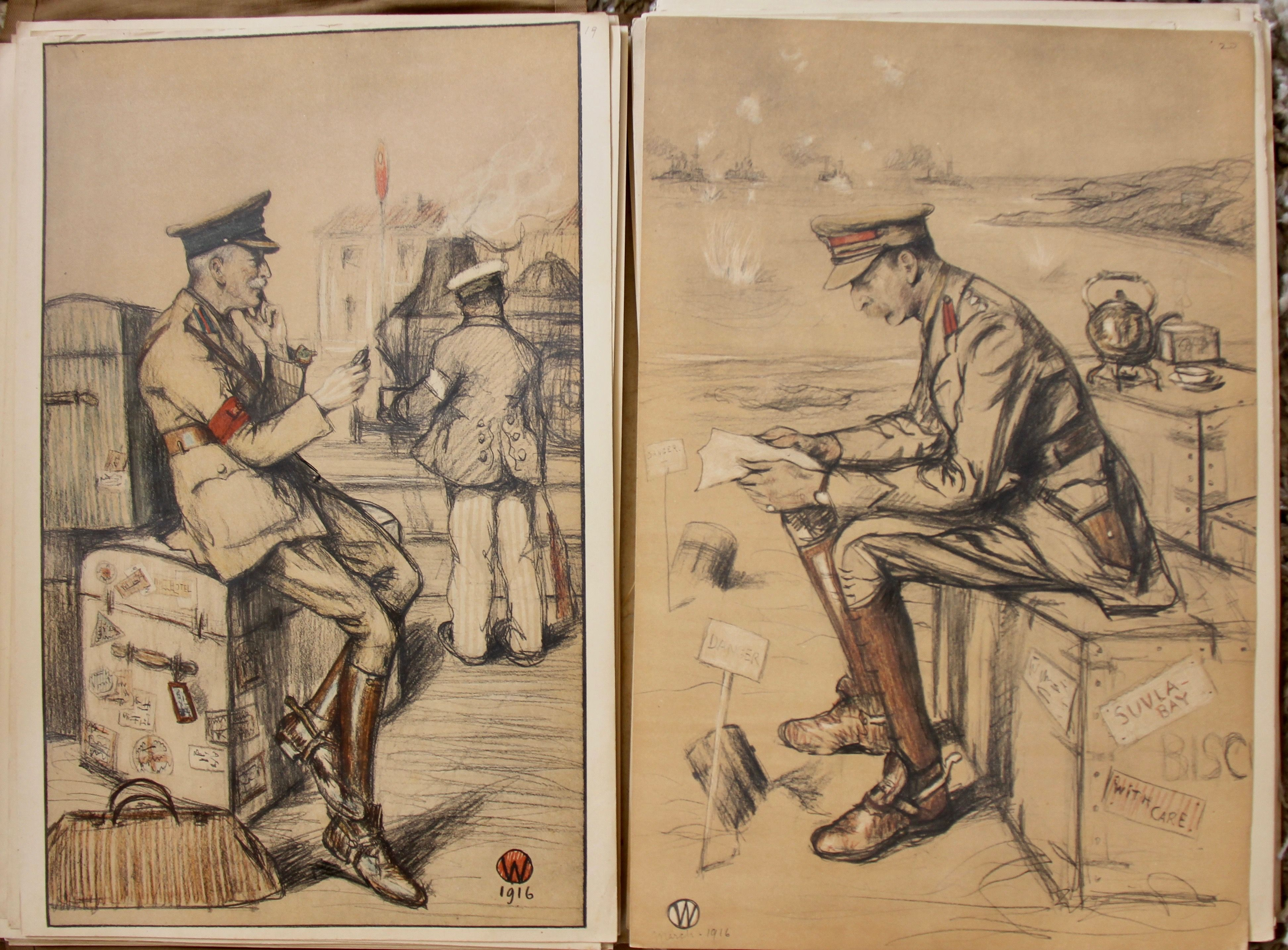
Sketches from Passed by Censor

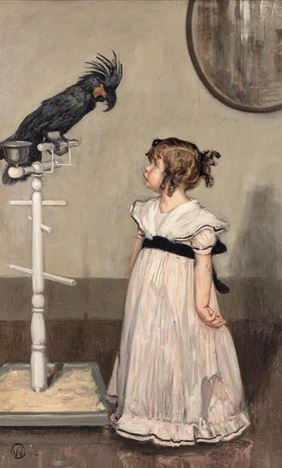
The Conversation

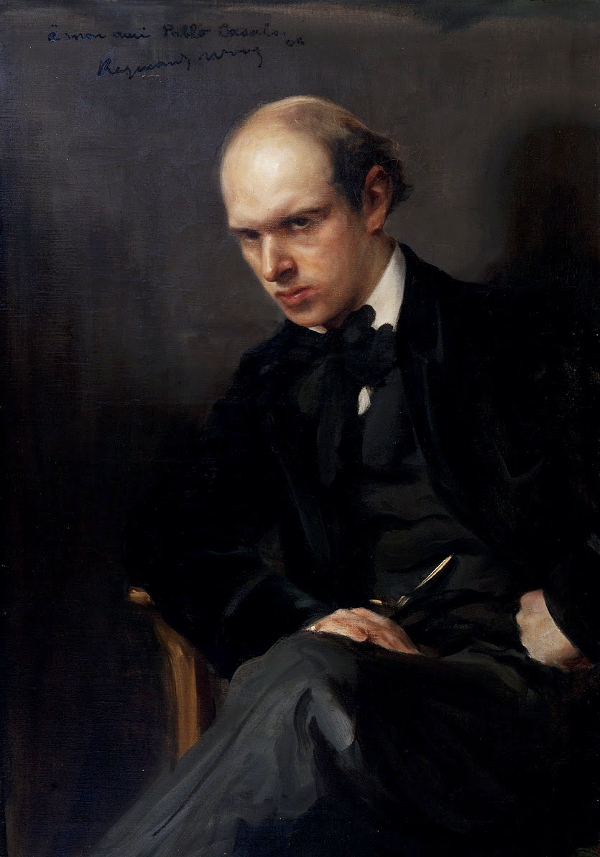
Pablo Casals (1906)
