= Trevor Atkinson =

English footballer

Personal information
- Full name: Trevor Atkinson
- Date of birth: 23 November 1942
- Place of birth: Bishop Auckland, England
- Date of death: 31 October 1992 (aged 49)
- Place of death: Durham, England
- Position: Wing half

Senior career*
Years	Team	Apps	(Gls)
19??–1963	Spennymoor United		
1963–1968	Darlington	141	(3)
1968–1970	Bradford Park Avenue	60	(6)
- * Club domestic league appearances and goals

Trevor Atkinson (23 November 1942 – 31 October 1992) was an English professional footballer who played as a wing half. He made over 200 appearances in the Football League for Darlington and Bradford Park Avenue.
