= Frank Hose =

Australian rules footballer

Personal information
- Full name: Frank Hose
- Born: 29 October 1920
- Died: 14 October 1992 (aged 71)
- Original teams: Newtown and Chilwell
- Height: 183 cm (6 ft 0 in)
- Weight: 85 kg (187 lb)

Playing career^{1}
Years	Club	Games (Goals)
1945	Geelong	14 (0)
- ^{1} Playing statistics correct to the end of 1945.

Frank Hose (29 October 1920 – 14 October 1992) was an Australian rules footballer who played with Geelong in the Victorian Football League (VFL).
