= Maurice Féaudierre =

French journalist, cheonicler, painter and illustrator

Maurice Féaudierre, better known by his pen-name, Serge, was born in Paris on 14 December 1901. He was a French journalist, chronicler, painter and illustrator, whose main interests were circus, variety, and the Gypsies—which were the subjects of his many books, paintings and drawings, magazine articles, and radio shows.

He produced and presented over the years several radio shows, such as Panorama des Variétés, Les Jeux du Cirque, Jeudi au Cirque, Circoradio, etc., and his writings have been published in many newspapers and magazines—Le Crapouillot, Comœdia, Les Nouvelles littéraires among them. As an artist, he was awarded a Grand prix at the Exposition internationale de Paris in 1937. He always illustrated his own books.

He was a well-known figure of the "Tout-Paris" of the theater and entertainment scene during his lifetime. He was the President of the French Académie du Cirque et du Music-Hall. Maurice Féaudierre showed a keen interest in magic, and often said that he had worked as a ventriloquist. His writing and speaking styles were famous for their wonderful flourish—which his recognizable, high-pitched voice made even more spectacular on his radio shows. He died in Paris on 16 October 1992.

== Biography ==
Son of Jules Victor Féaudierre, a painting contractor, and Marguerite Marie Céline Bauve, Maurice Féaudierre was born on December 14, 1901, at his parents' home at 129 Avenue de Wagram, 17th arrondissement of Paris.

Then residing at 28 rue Cardinet, he married Renée Marie Louise Madeleine Desbaines on April 24, 1928, at the town hall of the 17th arrondissement of Paris. The marriage was dissolved by divorce on July 6, 1931.

On January 9, 1936, while living at 73 Rue de Prony, he married Blanche Barbas [3] in a second marriage at the town hall of the 17th arrondissement of Paris.

Serge has made a name for himself as a historian of circus performances, author of numerous books on the world of the circus ring, and host of Radio broadcasting programs about the circus, including Panorama des variétés, Les Jeux du cirque, Jeudi au cirque, etc.

A genre painter and illustrator, he won a Grand Prize at the 1937 Exposition Internationale des Arts et Techniques dans la Vie Moderne.

== Publications ==
- Vive le Cirque, Phénomènes, acrobates, clowns, fauves., Marcel Seheur éditeur 1930. 65 documents photos sur clowns, fauves, acrobates, phénomènes (L'homme qui se dégonfle, Contorsionniste, La Famille Chimpanzé, Le Python géant de Marquitta, Le Kangourou boxeur etc.).
- Rue du monde. Marcel Seheur éditeur 1931.
- Le Monde du Cirque, Librairie des Champs-Élysées 1939. Le texte est le récit à la première personne d'une entrée dans le monde du cirque : de la découverte du fabuleux campement à la rencontre du clown, des filles de cirque et des fils du ciel, du roi du vélo, du dresseur de chiens etc. Le livre se termine par une liste de cirques volants et de familles de cirque.
- Panorama du Cirque, Éditions Arc en Ciel 1944.
- La Route des Cirques A. B. C. 1945. Le livre se termine par un dictionnaire du cirque : noms d'artistes, de cirques stables et volants du monde entier (y compris ceux des ancêtres de la piste), et termes de métier du cirque.
- L'île aux merveilles. Librairie des Champs-Élysées 1945. Contes fantastiques sur fond de tours de magiciens et autres farces de clowns.
- Londres secret et ses fantômes. Éditions Ergé 1946. De la découverte de Londres bombardée, à la cité des bords de la Tamise, avec une large place faite à l'évocation du cirque.
- Panache indien. Éditions Heracleia 1946.
- Histoire du Cirque. Illustrations photographiques et dessinées de l'auteur. Librairie Gründ 1947. Première histoire de la piste en français.
- Magie des Bohémiens. Librairie des Champs-Élysées, 1950. Des Saintes-Maries-de-la-Mer à Londres, Arles, Varsovie, Marseille, Paris : le quotidien des gitans et des gens du voyage, comme un périple où le cirque finite toujours par déballer ses toiles et ses mâts.
- Le vagabond de Paris. Librairie des Champs-Élysées, 1951.
- Gitanes et Toréros. Éditions Baudinière, 1952.
- Amar, Roi du Cirque. Éditions de Paris. Collection "Les Troubadours du Siècle". 1952.
- Paris, mon cœur. Éditions Seghers 1959.
- Clowns de Paris. Éditions des Presses du Temps Présent 1959.
- La grande histoire des bohémiens. Éditions Karolus 1963.
