= Jacques Delepaut =

French footballer (1926-1992)

Personal information
- Date of birth: 11 September 1926
- Place of birth: Tourcoing (Nord), France
- Date of death: 13 October 1992 (aged 66)
- Position: Defender

Youth career
- 1944–1948: US Tourcoing

Senior career*
Years	Team	Apps	(Gls)
1948–1948	CO Roubaix-Tourcoing		
1955–1958	Lille		
- * Club domestic league appearances and goals

Jacques Delepaut (11 September 1926 – 13 October 1992) was a French footballer. He was born in Tourcoing (Nord). He played as a defender for CO Roubaix-Tourcoing and Lille OSC in the 1950s. He was caretaker manager of Lille from December 1958 to June 1959.

== Honours ==
- B International
