= Ivan Besedin =

Russian head conductor

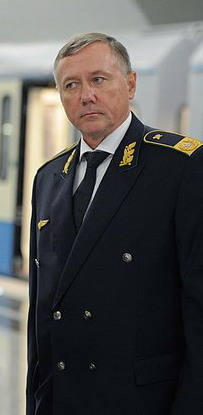
Ivan Besedin (2012)

Ivan Besedin (born 13 February 1954; Baku, Azerbaijan Soviet Socialist Republic) was a graduate of Moscow Institute of Engineers of Railway Transport and a former head of the Russian metro who was appointed on this position in February 2011 by Sergey Sobyanin. Prior to it he was in charge of Kaliningrad Railways. He was fired after July 15 train derailment in Moscow.
