= Yuli Gusman =

Soviet, Russian and Azerbaijani film director, actor (born 1943)

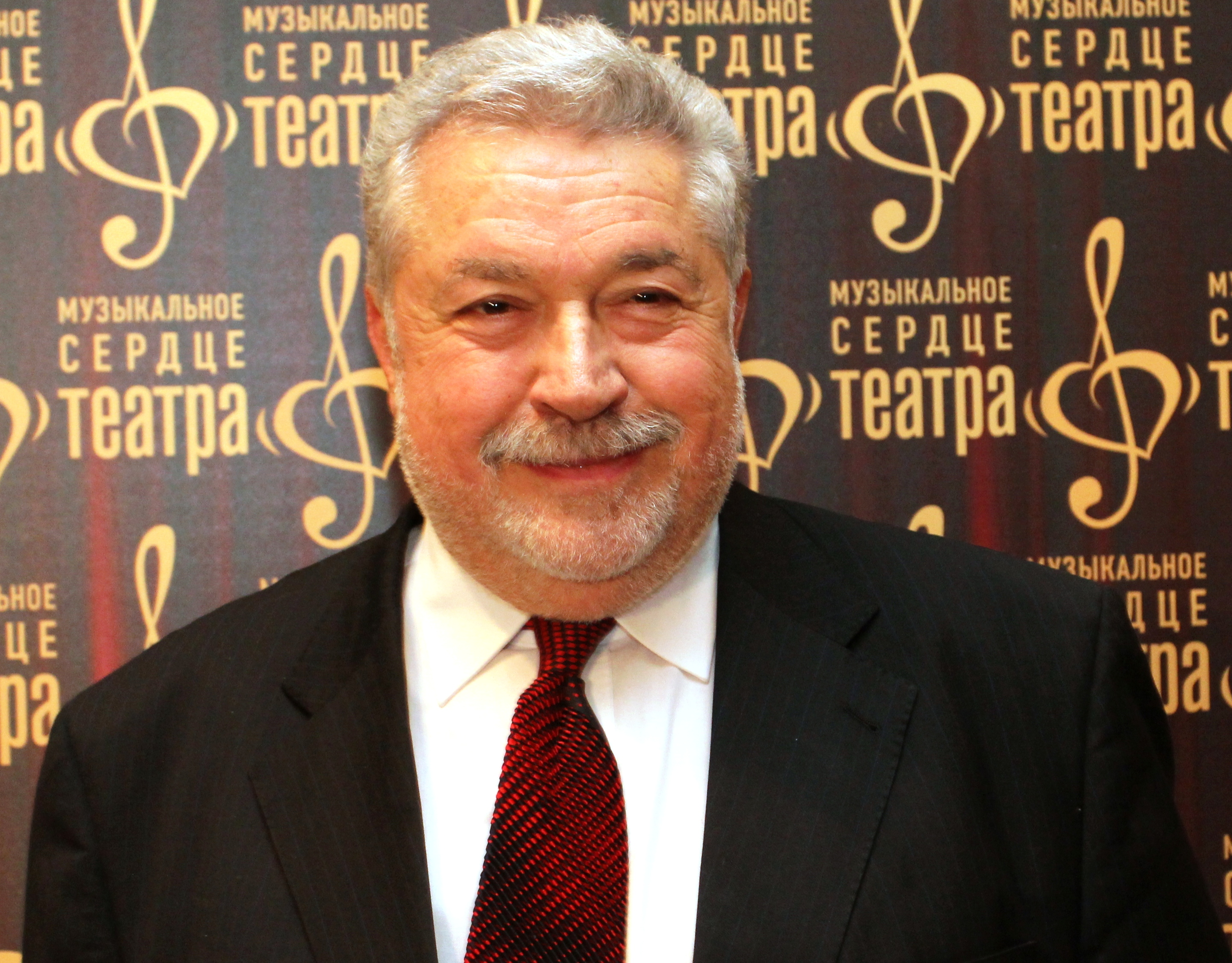
- Yuli Gusman in 2012
- Born: Yuli Solomonovich Gusman; 8 August 1943 (age 82); Baku, Azerbaijan SSR, USSR
- Occupations: Film director; actor
- Yuli Gusman's voice Recorded 15 February 2007
- Website: yulygusman.info

Yuli Solomonovich Gusman (Russian: Юлий Соломонович Гусман; born 8 August 1943) is a Soviet, Russian and Azerbaijani film director and actor. He is the founder and CEO of the Nika Award.

== Life and career ==
Yuli Gusman was born in Baku, Azerbaijan, to military physician Solomon Gusman and professor Lola Barsuk, who later became a translator and professor at the Azerbaijan University of Languages. His brother Mikhail is the vice-president of the Information Telegraph Agency of Russia. In 1966, Yuli Gusman graduated from the Azerbaijan Medical University, majoring in therapeutics, and in 1970 earned a master's degree in Psychology and Psychiatry. He wrote a research paper to defend a thesis for another medical degree, but chose not to do so after being admitted to the Higher Film Directing Courses at Goskino. Upon graduating in 1976, he worked at Azerbaijanfilm directed such films as Iliq danizda buz parçasi (1983) (An Iceberg in a Warm Sea) and Bir ailalik bag evi (1978) (A Dacha for One Family) and was the director of the satirical newsreel Mozalan. In the 1970s and the 1980s, he worked as manager and director of the Azerbaijan State Theatre of Musical Comedy and the Song Theatre. He has directed seven films and a number of stage plays, including outside the Soviet Union (in the United States, Japan and China).

In 1965–1972 he was head of Baku's KVN team. He introduced the uniform practice for all KVN teams. In 1993, he was elected to the State Duma of the first convocation (1993–1995). In 1988–2002 Gusman was chairman of the Cinematography Centre (Dom Kino) in Moscow. In 1996–2000 he hosted the primetime talk-show Tema and the weekly talk-show Vecher s Yuliem Gusmanom ("An Evening with Yuli Gusman") on Channel One (Russia). In 1996, he founded and became one of the CEOs of the Russian Jewish Congress. In 2004, he was awarded the Order of Friendship.

He is married to Valida Gusman, a French language professor and retired lecturer in the Slavic Languages Department at Georgetown University.

== Notable filmography ==
=== As a director ===
- On One Fine Day (В один прекрасный день, Azerbaijanfilm, 1977)
- Cottage for a Family (Дачный домик для одной семьи, Azerbaijanfilm, 1978)
- Don't Be Afraid, I Am Here For You (Не бойся, я с тобой, Azerbaijanfilm, 1981)
- Ice Floe In The Warm Sea (Льдина в тёплом море, 1986)
- The Soviet Period Park (Парк советского периода, Slovo, 2006)
- Don't Be Afraid, I Am Here For You! 1919 (Не бойся, я с тобой! 1919, Azerbaijanfilm, WaiT Media, 2011)

=== As an actor ===
- Nastya (Mosfilm, 1993), as TV-host
- The Soviet Period Park (Slovo, 2006), as himself
