= Giovanni Scotti =

Italian ice hockey player

Personal information
- Born: 1 September 1911 Milan, Italy
- Died: 26 October 1992 (aged 81) Garden City, New York, U.S.

Sport
- Sport: Ice hockey

Giovanni Scotti (1 September 1911 – 26 October 1992) was an Italian ice hockey player. He competed in the men's tournament at the 1936 Winter Olympics.
