= Safura Ibrahimova =

Azerbaijani actress (1938–2020)

Safura Ibrahimova Səfurə İbrahimova
- Born: December 27, 1938; Baku, Azerbaijan SSR, USSR
- Died: December 21, 2020 (aged 81); Baku, Azerbaijan
- Burial place: Yasamal cemetery
- Occupation: actress
- Years active: 1960–2005
- Awards: State Prize of the Azerbaijan SSR

Safura Aghabala gizi Ibrahimova (Azerbaijani: Səfurə Ağabala qızı İbrahimova, December 27, 1938 — December 21, 2020) was an Azerbaijani film and theater actress, People's Artiste of Azerbaijan (2002), and laureate of the State Prize of the Azerbaijan SSR (1984).

== Biography ==
Safura Ibrahimova was born on December 27, 1938, in Baku. In 1955–1960, she worked at "Stalinneft", at secondary school No. 44, and joined the drama club. In 1960, she joined the drama and film acting department of the Azerbaijan State Theater Institute. While studying in the first year, she was invited to play the role of Khatira in the play "Mother's Heart" by Islam Safarli, which was in the repertoire of the Academic National Drama Theatre. After that, the student-actress, who played several more roles, joined the troupe of the Academic Theater on November 1, 1961. Safura Ibrahimova worked in this theater until 2005.

In 1967, during the time of the USSR, during the Nowruz holiday, the first spring girl was Safura Ibrahimova. The actress died on December 21, 2020.

== Awards ==
- People's Artiste of Azerbaijan — December 24, 2002
- Honored Artist of the Azerbaijan SSR — June 1, 1974
- State Prize of the Azerbaijan SSR — April 27, 1984
