= Rovshan Aliyev (soldier) =

Azerbaijani soldier

- Born: August 30, 1972; Baku, Azerbaijan
- Died: June 14, 1992 (aged 19); Khojaly District, Azerbaijan
- Military career
- Allegiance: Republic of Azerbaijan
- Service years: 1991-1992
- Conflicts: First Nagorno-Karabakh War
- Awards: National Hero of Azerbaijan; 1992

Rovshan Aliyev (Azerbaijani: Rövşən Əliyev) (30 August 1972, Baku, Azerbaijan – 14 June 1992, Khojaly District, Azerbaijan) was a soldier who served in the First Nagorno-Karabakh War. He was awarded the National Hero of Azerbaijan award.

== Early life and education ==
Rovshan Aliyev was born in Baku on 30 August 1972. His origins are related to Yarpizli village of Basarkecher district of Goycha mahal. In 1989 after graduating from school No. 254 in Khatai District he entered the Faculty of Mechanical Engineering of the Azerbaijan State Polytechnic Institute. In 1991, Rovshan voluntarily joined the ranks of Azerbaijani Armed Forces and went to the front-line.

=== Personal life ===
Aliyev was single.

== First Nagorno-Karabakh War ==
Rovshan joined the battles in the ranks of the national defense militia established in Aghdam. He took an active part in the battles for the liberation of villages Sirkhavend and Gazanchi. He received a new assignment in March: "Soldiers must take up positions on the heights of Muganly and Shykhbabaly". Aliyev died on June 14, 1992 during the battles in Dahraz village of Khojali District of Azerbaijan.

== Honors ==
By the Decree of the President of Azerbaijan No. 350 dated December 7, 1992 senior lieutenant Rovshan Aliyev was posthumously awarded the title of "National Hero of Azerbaijan". He was buried at a Martyrs' Lane cemetery in Baku. The school, where he studied, and one of the streets in Baku are named after him.

== See also ==
- First Nagorno-Karabakh War
- National Hero of Azerbaijan

== Sources ==
- Vugar Asgarov. Azərbaycanın Milli Qəhrəmanları (Yenidən işlənmiş II nəşr). Bakı: "Dərələyəz-M", 2010, səh. 88–89.
