= Josef Schilhab =

Austrian architect

- Born: 12 January 1908; Schwechat, Austria-Hungary
- Died: 11 October 1992 (aged 84); Schwechat, Austria
- Occupation: Architect

Josef Schilhab (12 January 1908 – 11 October 1992) was an Austrian architect. His work was part of the architecture event in the art competition at the 1936 Summer Olympics.
