= Jack Indian =

Australian rules footballer

Personal information
- Full name: Jack Indian
- Born: 6 June 1926
- Died: 24 October 1992 (aged 66)
- Original team: South Melbourne Tech
- Height: 179 cm (5 ft 10 in)
- Weight: 73 kg (161 lb)

Playing career^{1}
Years	Club	Games (Goals)
1944	St Kilda	1 (0)
- ^{1} Playing statistics correct to the end of 1944.

Jack Indian (6 June 1926 – 24 October 1992) was an Australian rules footballer who played with St Kilda in the Victorian Football League (VFL).
