= Svetlana Tatunts =

Armenian-born Russian researcher

Svetlana A. Tatunts
- Светлана Ахундовна Татунц
- Born: 1953 (age 72–73); Baku, USSR
- Occupations: Professor, Researcher
- Known for: Development of Ethnosociology in Russia
- Awards: Certificate of Honor from Russian Ministry of Education and Science, Honored Professor of Moscow State University

Academic background
- Education: Baku State University
- Thesis: "Ethnosociology as a science" (1996)

Academic work
- Discipline: Sociology, Ethnic Studies, Political Science
- Institutions: Moscow State University
- Main interests: Interethnic relations, Ethnic minorities, Tolerance, Xenophobia, Ethnic migration, Diaspora studies
- Notable works: Ethnosociology, Ethnic Conflicts, Migration Studies

Svetlana Akhundova Tatunts, (Светлана Ахундовна Татунц; 1953 in Baku, USSR) is an Armenian-born Russian researcher of sociology, ethnicity, ethnic and national conflicts. She is a full professor at the Department of World Politics of Moscow State University named after Lomonosov (MSU).

== Biography ==
Svetlana A. Tatunts graduated from the History Department of Baku State University in 1978 and earned a Ph.D. in social sciences from MSU in 1983. After several years as an associate professor, she earned a Doctor of Science degree for her Sc.D. thesis on "Ethnosociology as a science" at the MSU Faculty of Sociology in 1996. The year before, she conducted research at the Sociology Department of Regensburg University, Germany.

Tatunts taught at the MSU Faculty of Sociology from 1998 to 2008. Thanks to her efforts, the discipline of ethnosociology has become a part of the academic curriculum for social and political science students at MSU and other Russian universities. She was the author of the Russian State curriculum for “Ethnosociology” and “Ethnics in political sciences” according to the State standard of the Russian Ministry of Education and Science and mentor for numerous Ph.D. and Master's theses in these fields.

In 2008, Tatunts changed to the MSU Faculty of World politics where she lectures at the chair in Regional Problems of World Politics and does research. Tatunts is a member of the Russian Sociological Association and the International Institute of Sociology. She holds a Certificate of Honor of the Russian Ministry of Education and Science and was recognized as an Honored Professor of Moscow State University.

== Research interests ==
Tatunts wrote more than 70 scientific works in the field of sociology, political science and conflict studies, published in Russia and abroad, including German, English, Spanish and Italian articles. The regional focus of her research lies on the C.I.S. countries, as well as Central and Western Europe and Latin America.

Her particular scientific interests are in interethnic relations, ethnic minorities, tolerance and xenophobia, ethnic migration processes in the modern world, the integration of immigrants in Eastern and Western European countries. She also works on ethnic conflict and diaspora as а factor of modern foreign policy and political conflict resolution in C.I.S. countries.

== Selected works ==
- Will autumn come to „nationalism“? About nation, nationalism and national politics. Moscow, 1995 (Наступит ли осень «национализма»? К вопросу о нации, национализме и национальной политики)
- Interethnical contradictions and conflicts in the North Caucasus region of the Russian Federation. Opladen: Westdeutscher Verlag 1997 (Interethnische Widersprüche und Konflikte in der Nordkaukasus-Region der Russischen Föderation. In: Robert Hettlage (Hrsg.) Kollektive Identität in Krisen. Ethnizität in Region, Nation, Europa.), pp. 216–226
- Ethnopolitical conflicts and geopolitical factors (scientific editor, author: O.I.Arshba), Moscow, 1998 (Этнополитические конфликты и геополитические факторы - научная редакция, автор: Аршба О.И.)
- Ethnosociology, Moscow, 1999 (Этносоциология)
- Nation and nationalism. History and theory in texts and documents, Moscow, 2002 (Нация и национализм. История и теория в текстах и документах)
- Immigration, Integration, Naturalization. Experiences of Western European countries (scientific editor, author: O.I.Arshba), Moscow, 2012 (Иммиграция, интеграция, натурализация. Опыт западноевропейских стран - научная редакция, автор: Аршба О.И.)
- European idea defeats right-wing populism in European elections (Идея Европы побеждает правый популизм на евровыборах), co-author K. Berndt Public administration (Государственная служба), № 5, 2019, pp. 76-82
- Politics of memory of the Armenian Diaspora in Latin America (La política de memoria de la diáspora armenia en los países latinoamericanos), co-author A.M. Ponamareva, Ibéroamerica, № 4, 2020, pp. 124-144
- Germany's Soft Power Policy in Latin America (La política del poder blando de Alemania en America Latina), Ibéroamerica, № 4, 2021, pp. 80-100
- The global crisis of COVID-19 in the Latin American region in the context of the "North-South" divide (La política del poder blando de Alemania en America Latina), Ibéroamerica, № 1, 2022, pp. 160-180
