= Zakir Yusifov =

National Hero of Azerbaijan

- Born: September 29, 1956; Baku, Azerbaijan
- Died: October 11, 1992 (aged 36); Lachin, Azerbaijan
- Military career
- Allegiance: Republic of Azerbaijan
- Conflicts: First Nagorno-Karabakh War
- Awards: National Hero of Azerbaijan; 1992

Zakir Yusifov (Azerbaijani: Zakir Tofiq oğlu Yusifov; September 29, 1956, in Baku, Azerbaijan – October 11, 1992, in Lachin, Azerbaijan) was a National Hero of Azerbaijan, and a warrior of the First Nagorno-Karabakh War.

== Life ==
Zakir Yusifov was born September 29, 1956, in Baku, Azerbaijan. In 1974, he graduated from school No. 194 and entered the Civil Aviation School named after Sasovski. In 1977, he finished his education and began to work in Yevlakh city. There he was appointed commander of an AN-2 aircraft. In 1988, he graduated from Baku State University, at the School of Law. Establishing the first military helicopter squadron was a very difficult task, but Yusifov successfully completed it along with his co-worker, Yaver Aliyev.

== Military activities ==
The most successful of his flights was on April 11. For the first time, Zakir Yusifov made a successful flight to Fuzuli-Khojavend. He completed his combat mission and returned. Zakir Yusifov fought with Armenian soldiers in Fuzuli, Khojavend, Tartar, Aghdere, Shushakand. During the next flight on October 11, 1992, his helicopter was shot by Armenians. The crew of the helicopter crashed while flying to Safyan village.

== National hero and memorials ==
By decree of the President of Azerbaijan on February 5, 1993, Yusifov was posthumously awarded the title of "National Hero of Azerbaijan" after his death. He was buried in the Martyrs' Lane in Baku. One of the streets in the Nizami district of Baku and the secondary school number 194 were named after him.

== Sources ==
- Vüqar Əsgərov. "Azərbaycanın Milli Qəhrəmanları" (Yenidən işlənmiş II nəşr). Bakı: "Dərələyəz-M", 2010, səh. 154.
