= Ron Reynolds (Australian footballer) =

Australian rules footballer

Personal information
- Full name: Ronald William Reynolds
- Born: 29 April 1916; South Melbourne, Victoria
- Died: 26 October 1992 (aged 76)
- Original team: Port Melbourne (VFA)
- Height: 184 cm (6 ft 0 in)
- Weight: 80 kg (176 lb)

Playing career^{1}
Years	Club	Games (Goals)
1939–41	Port Melbourne (VFA)	53 (18)
1942	South Melbourne	2 (1)
1945–50	Port Melbourne (VFA)	106 (38)
- ^{1} Playing statistics correct to the end of 1950.

Ronald William Reynolds (29 April 1916 – 26 October 1992) was an Australian rules footballer who played with South Melbourne in the Victorian Football League (VFL) and Port Melbourne in the Victorian Football Association.

== Family ==
The son of William Reynolds, and Elizabeth Mary Reynolds, née Hickey, Ronald Reynolds was born in South Melbourne, Victoria on 29 April 1916.

== War service ==
Reynolds served in the Australian Army during World War II.
