= Shabaka (window) =

Stained-glass windows in Azerbaijan

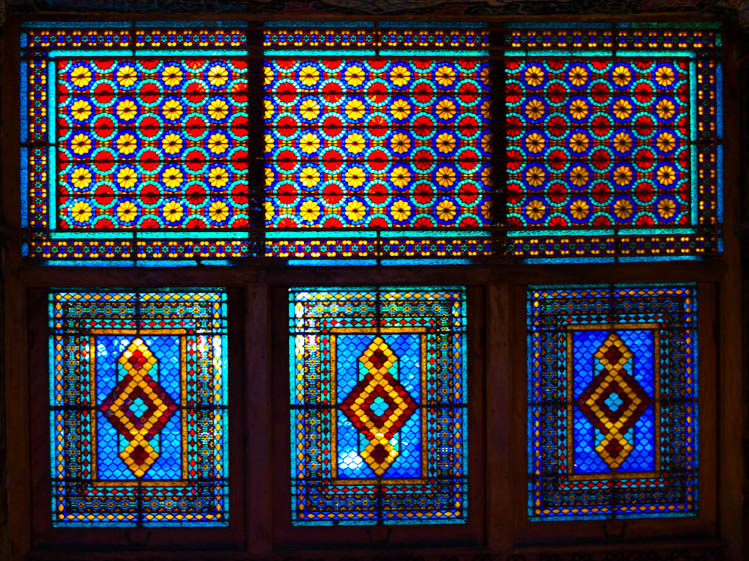
Shabaka-windows in interior of the Palace of Shaki Khans

Shebeke are windows filled with coloured glass, made from small wooden parts without glue and nails.

The building of the Sheki Khans Palace, shebeke fills walls, window openings of halls and rooms. Geometrically, shebeke windows fit with the general composition of the main facade of the palace. The continuous stained-glass shebeke-windows of the central halls and side rooms overlook the facade of the palace. It is believed that the replacement of the outer walls of the halls of both floors and the upper rooms by lifting sashes-stained-glass windows is a feature of this ceremonial pavilion architecture.

== Shebeke art in Azerbaijan ==
On the territory of Azerbaijan, shebeke as an art form was widespread in cities such as Sheki, Shusha, Ordubad, Baku, Ganja, Lankaran, Nakhichevan and Derbent (Russian Federation). The main center of Shebeke art is Sheki, where this tradition is still presented in its pure, classic form. Samples of this kind of art dated with 18th-19th centuries are concentrated here. A classic example of this art form is the Sheki Khans Palace (1762).

Shebeke art and its symbolism differ to some extent throughout the regions of Azerbaijan. For example, from the point of view of the manufacturing technology, the Ordubad craftsmen preferred the simplicity of the geometric shapes and an ascetic colour scheme. However, despite this, in almost all regions of the country, the coloured glass is the main material.

== See also ==
- Stained glass

== Gallery ==
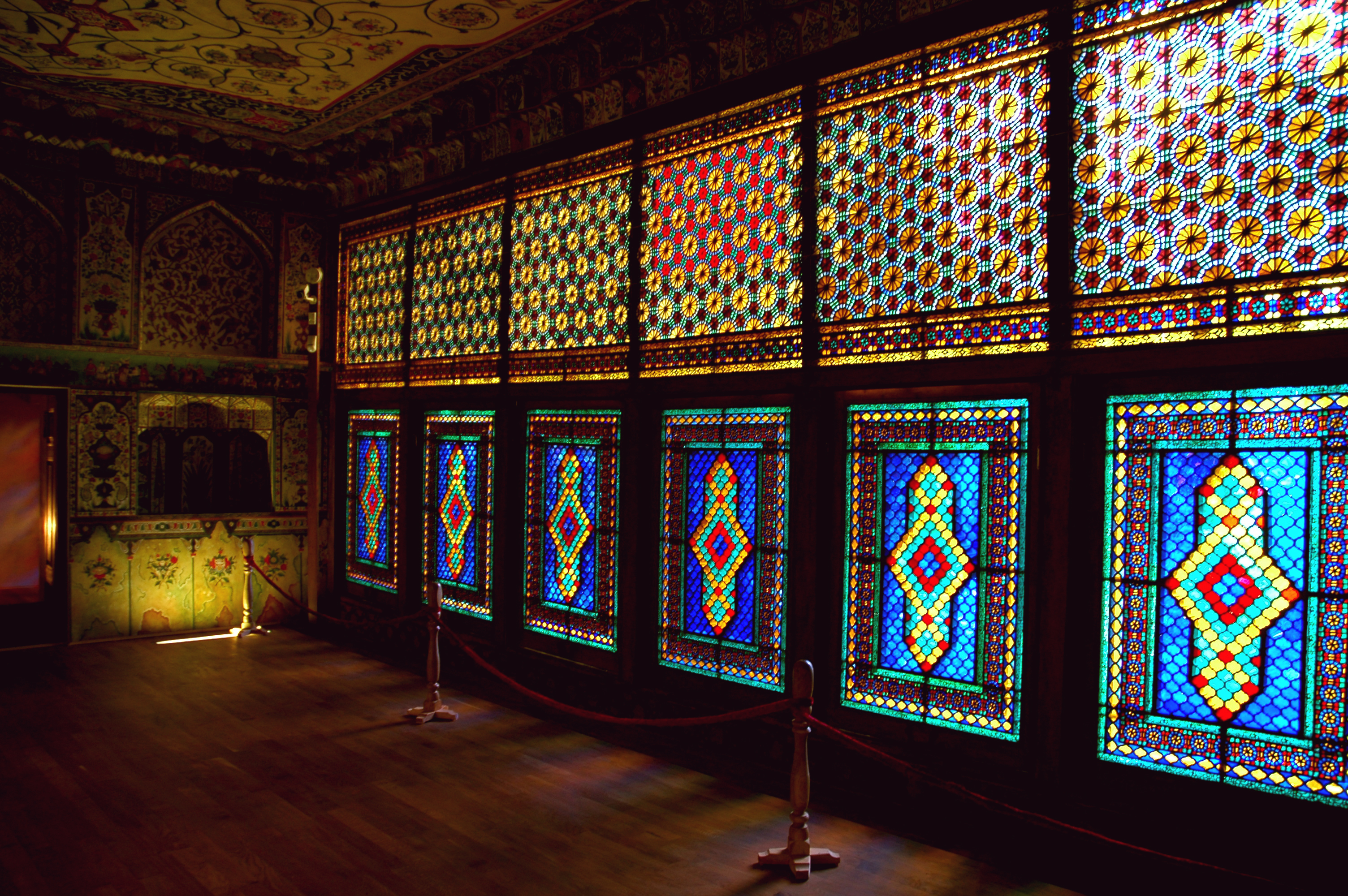

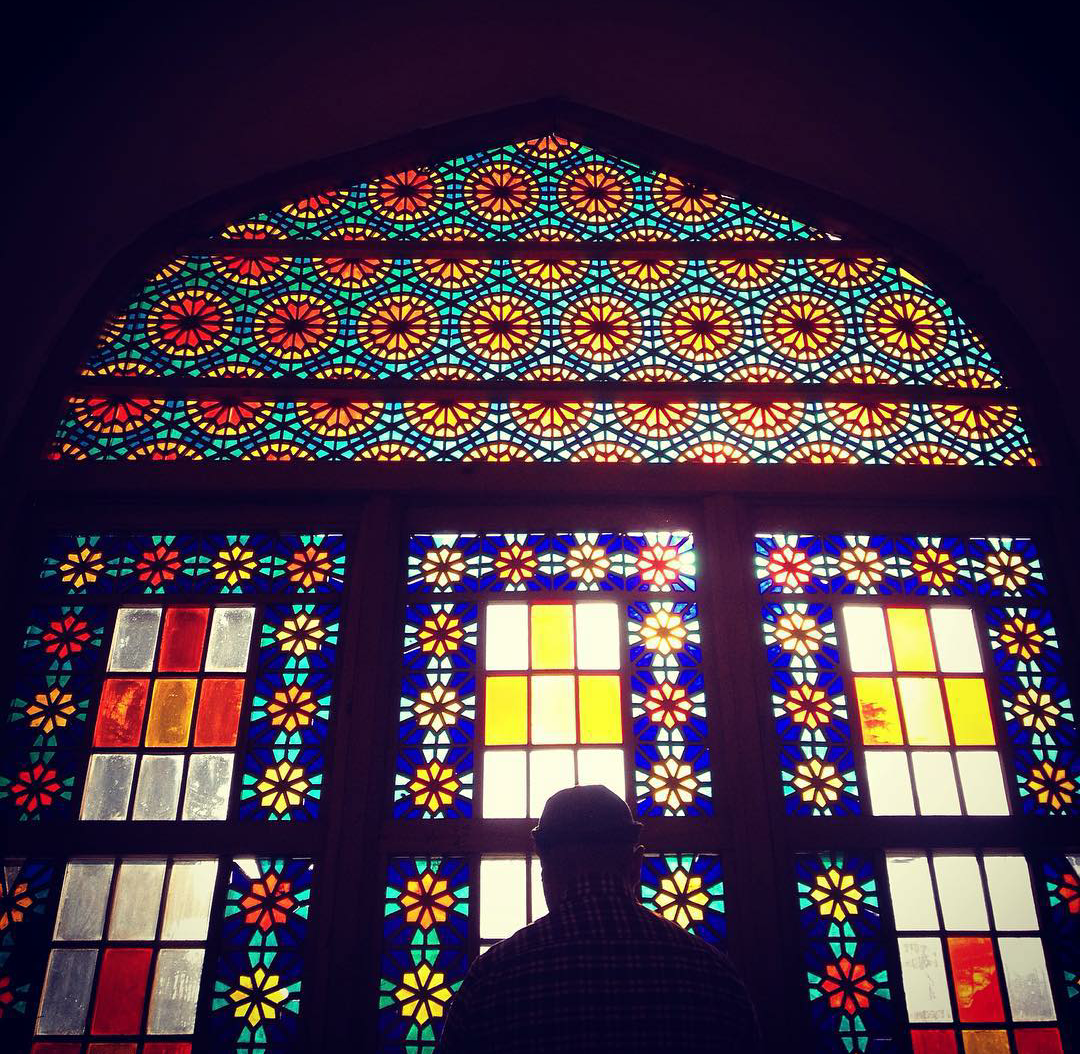

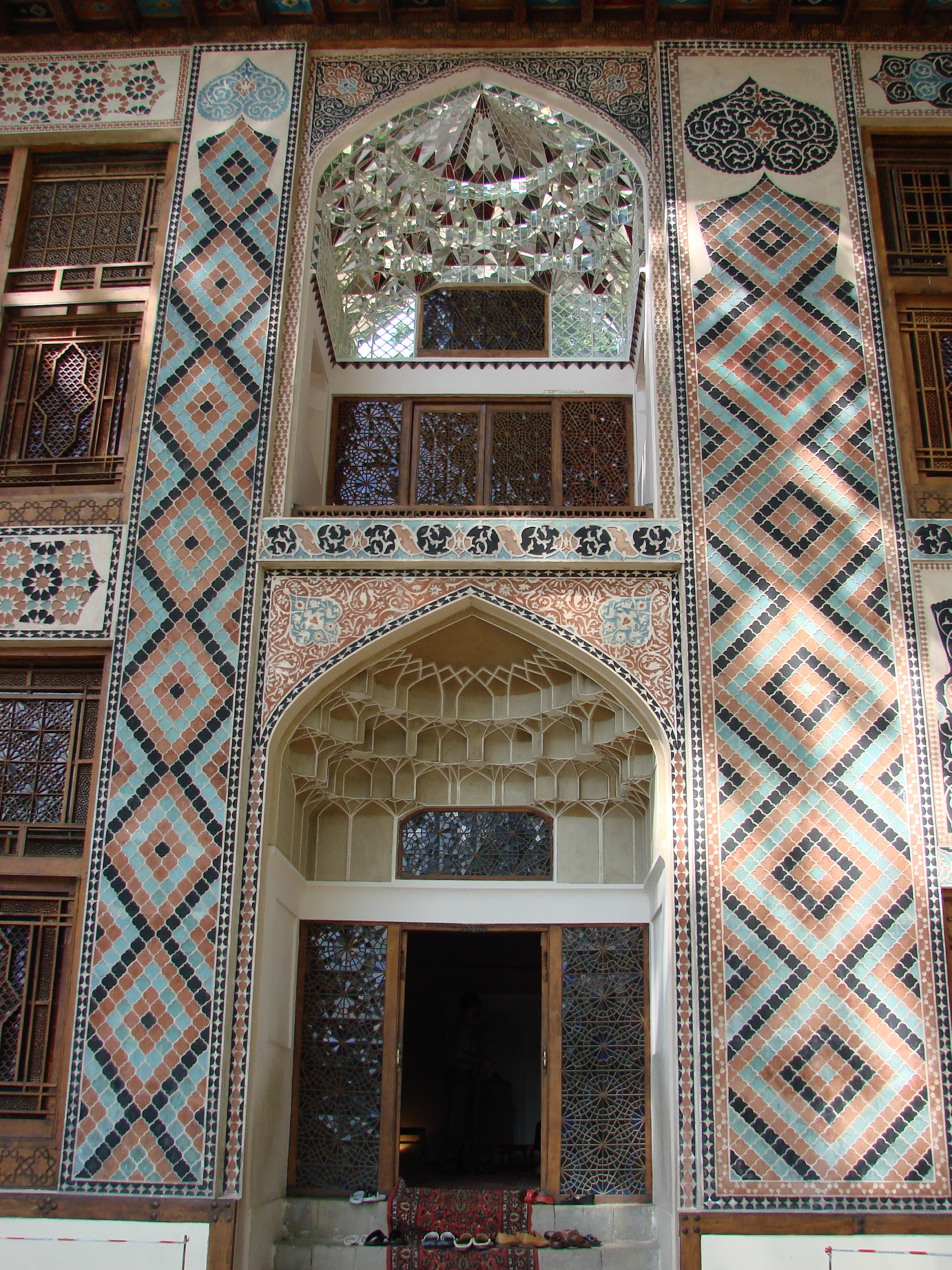

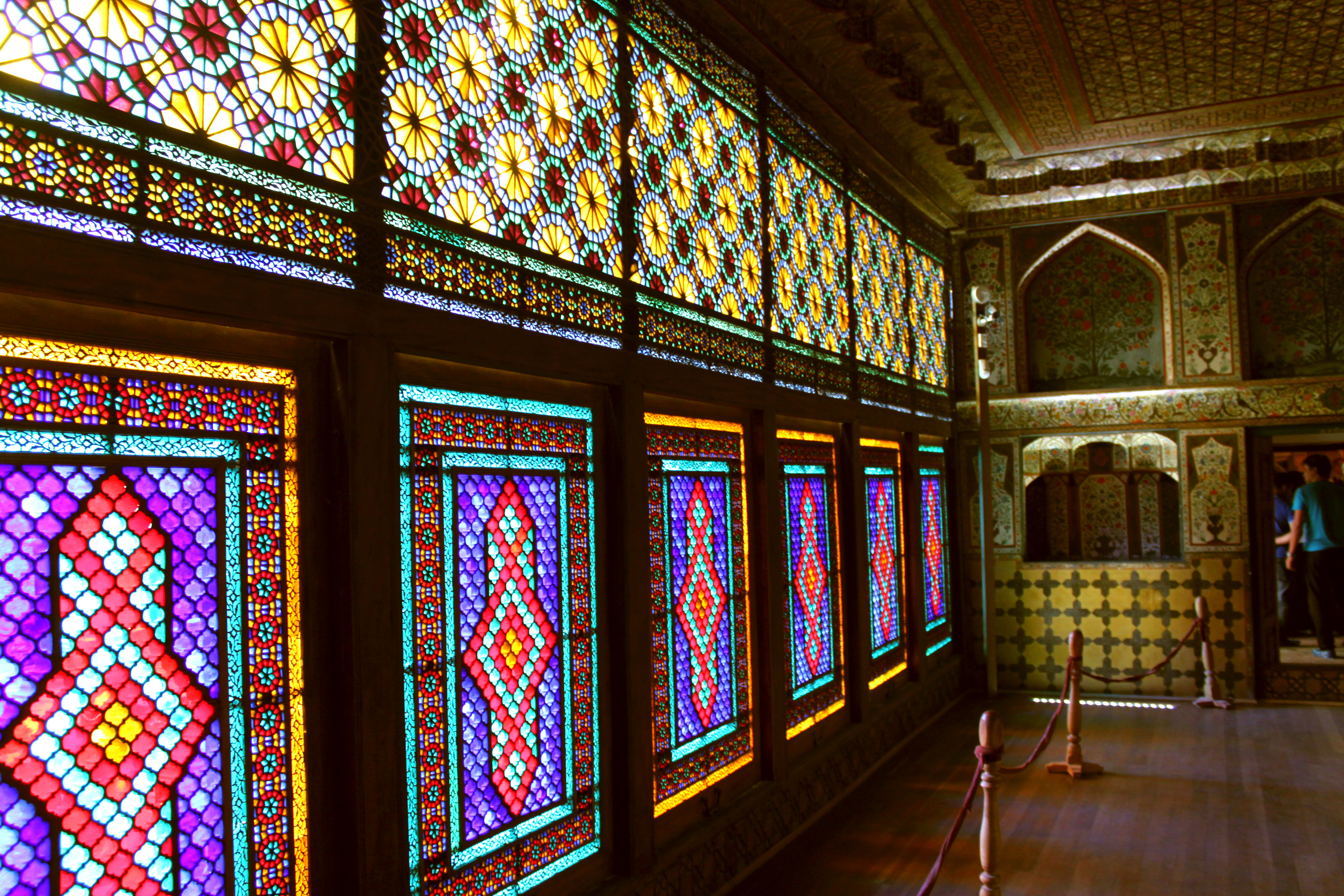

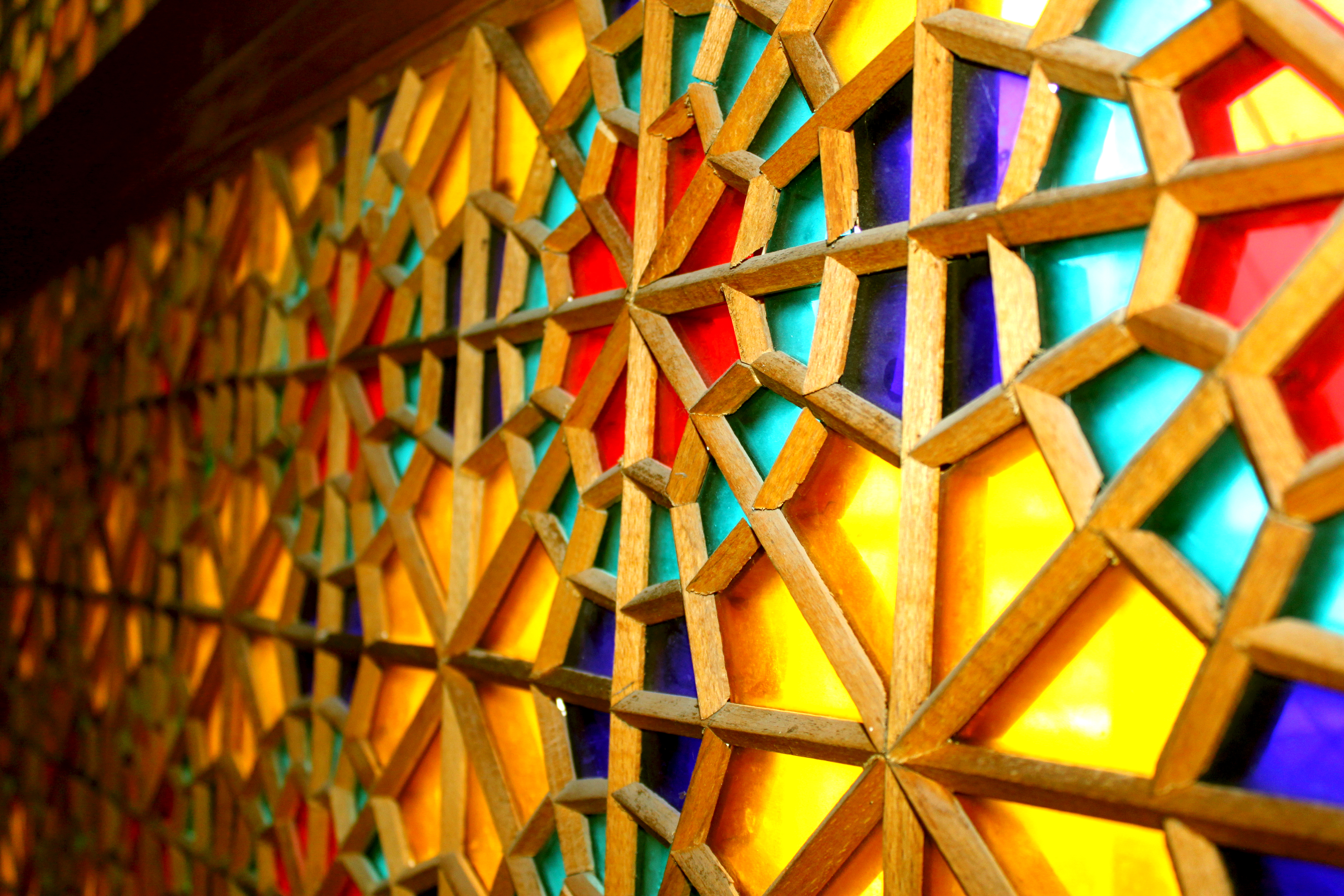

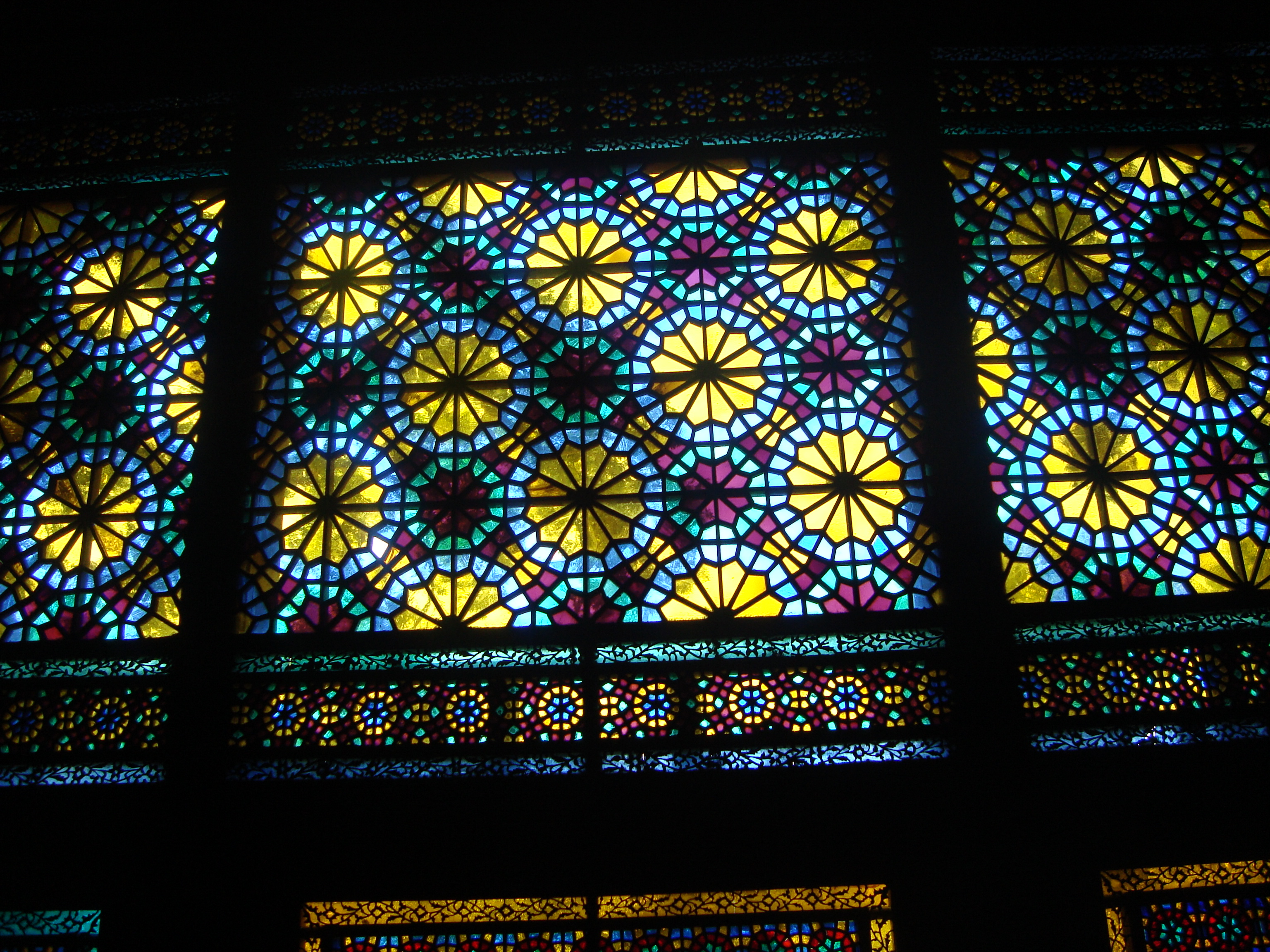

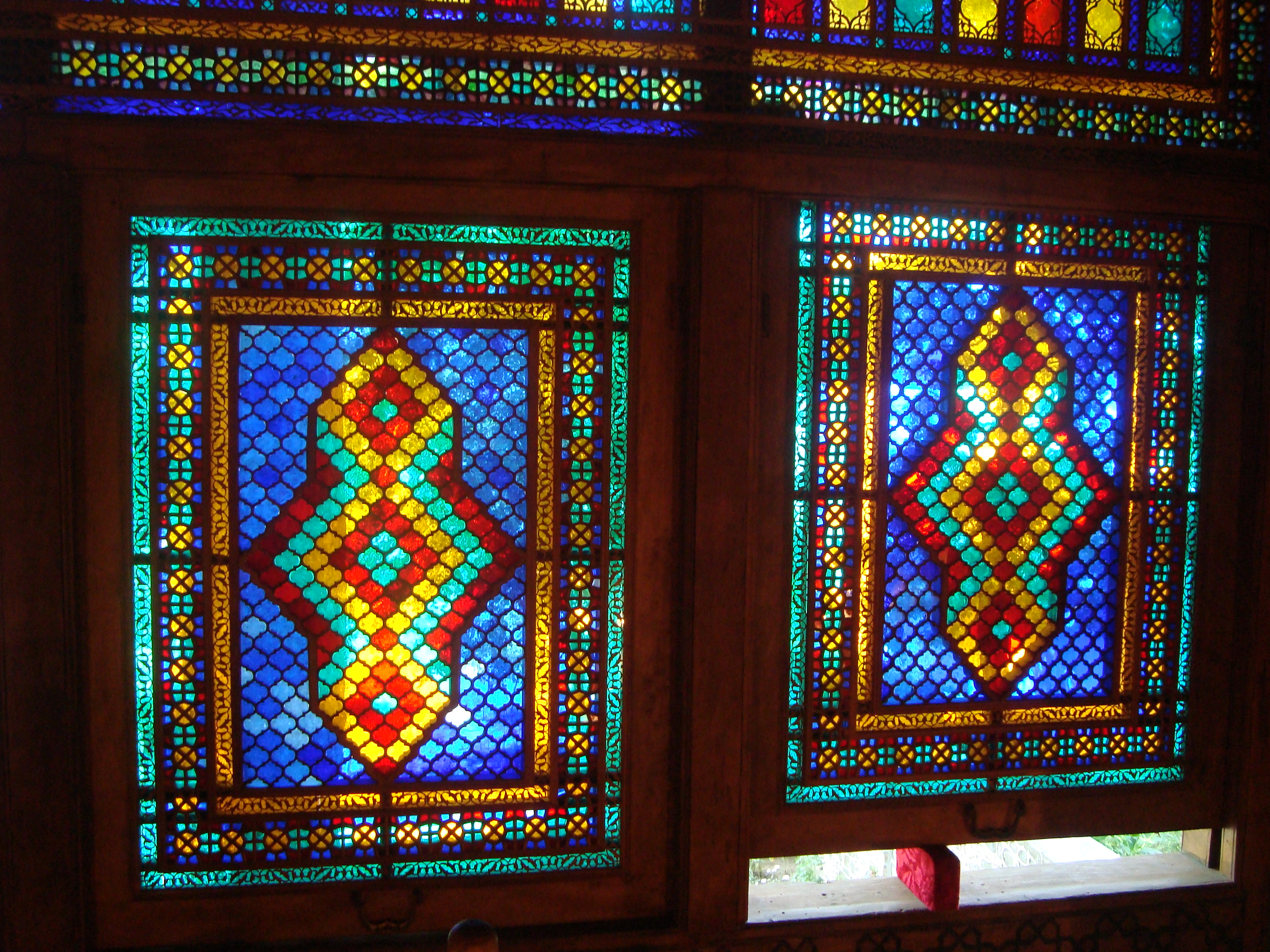

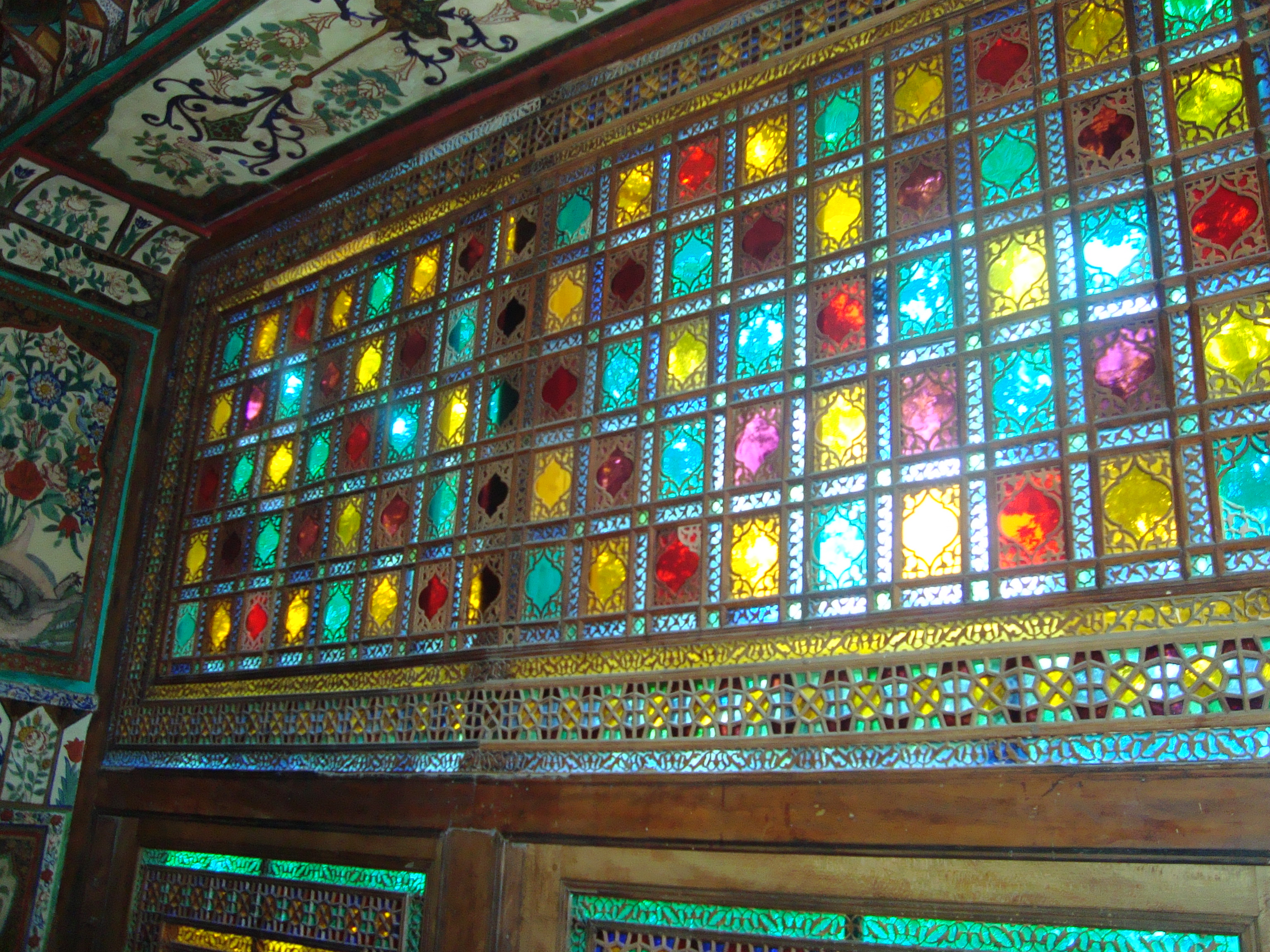

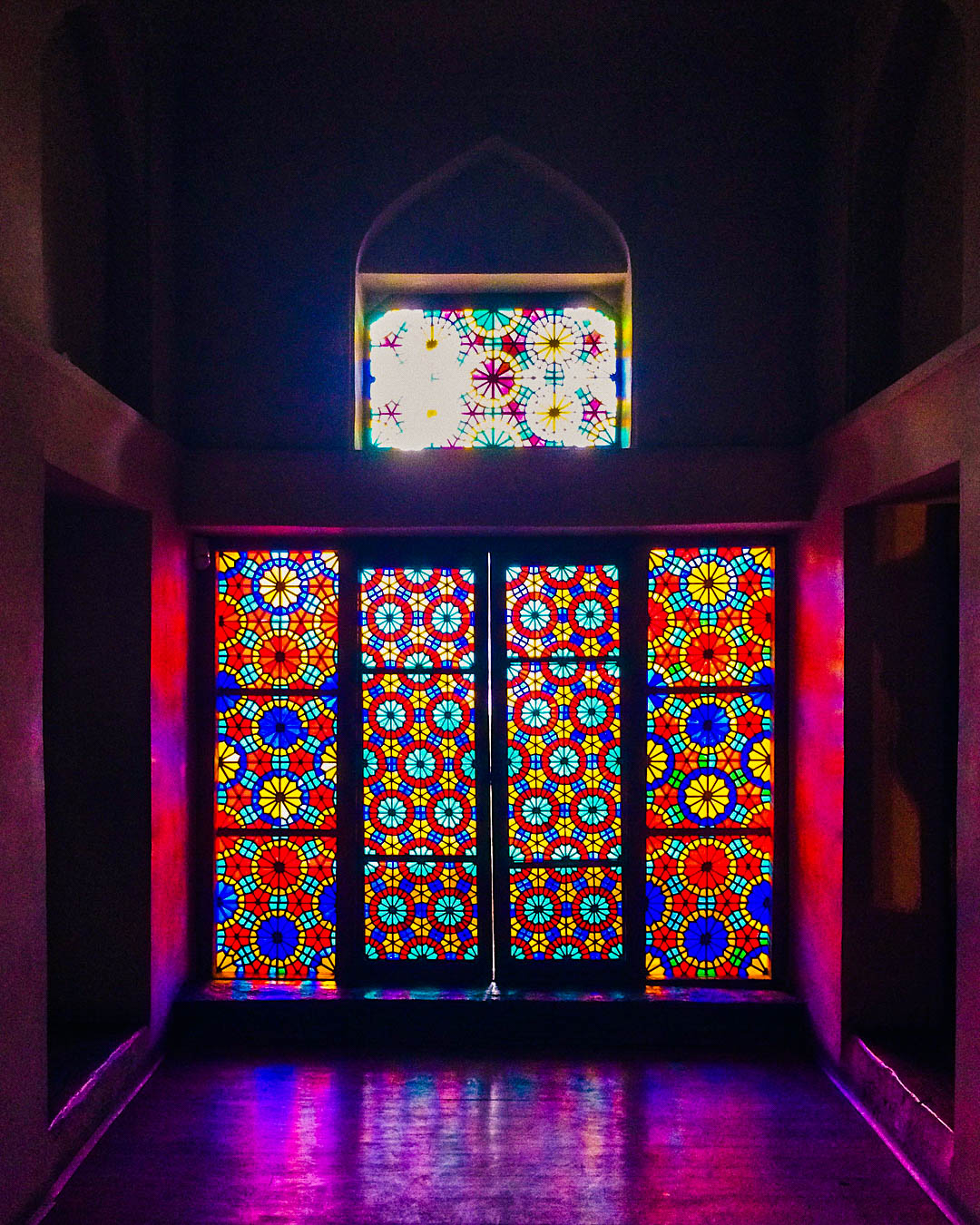
