= Ilgar Ismailov =

National Hero of Azerbaijan

- İlqar İsmayılov
- Born: 29 March 1959; Baku, Azerbaijan SSR
- Died: 1 October 1992 (aged 33)
- Military career
- Allegiance: Azerbaijan
- Branch: Azerbaijani Armed Forces
- Service years: 1991–1992
- Conflicts: First Nagorno-Karabakh War
- Awards: National Hero of Azerbaijan; 1992

Ilgar Saadi oglu Ismailov (Azerbaijani: İsmayılov İlqar Sədi oğlu; 29 March 1959, Baku, Azerbaijan SSR – 1 October 1992) was a National Hero of Azerbaijan and warrior during the First Nagorno-Karabakh War.

== Early life and education ==
Ismailov was born on 29 March 1959 in Baku, Azerbaijan SSR. In 1966, he went to the Secondary School No. 45 in Baku and in 1976 he completed his education. Then, he was admitted to Azerbaijan Physical Training Institute. From 1981 through 1983, Ismailov served in the Soviet Armed Forces.

Ismailov was married and had two children.

== First Nagorno-Karabakh War ==
When Armenians attacked the territories of Azerbaijan, Ismailov voluntarily went to the front-line. Under his leadership, 128 Azerbaijani warriors released Qizarti heights from Armenian armed troops. He was killed in a battle by Armenian soldiers on 1 October 1992.

== Honors ==
Ilgar Saadi oglu Ismailov was posthumously awarded the title of the "National Hero of Azerbaijan" under Presidential Decree No. 273 dated 19 October 1992. Ismailov was buried at a Martyrs' Lane cemetery in Baku.

One of the street in Baku was named after him.

== See also ==
- First Nagorno-Karabakh War
- List of National Heroes of Azerbaijan
