= Mikhail Gusman =

Azerbaijani-Russian journalist (born 1950)

Mikhail Gusman OMRI
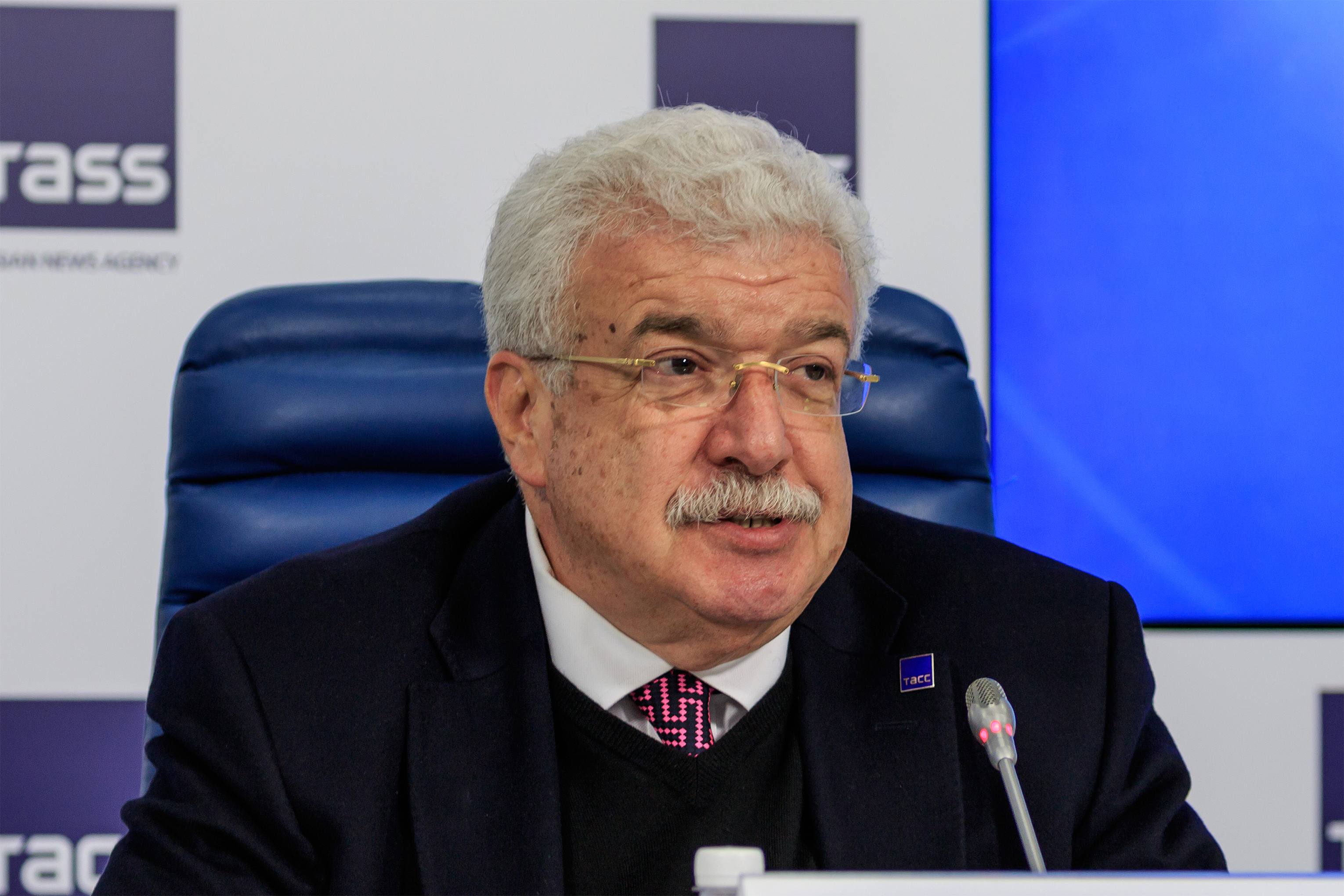
- Mikhail Gusman, 17 January 2017
- Born: Mikhail Solomonovich Gusman; 23 January 1950 (age 76); Baku, Azerbaijan SSR, USSR
- Occupation: Journalist

Signature
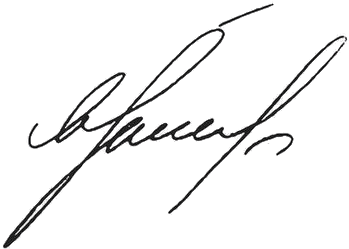

Mikhail Solomonovich Gusman (Russian: Михаил Соломонович Гусман; Azerbaijani: Mixail Solomonoviç Qusman; born 23 January 1950) is a Soviet and Russian journalist and interviewer of Azerbaijani origins. He served as the First Deputy Director-General of TASS from 1999 to 2025.

== Life and career ==
Mikhail Gusman was born in Baku, Azerbaijan to military physician of the Caspian Flotilla Lieutenant Colonel Solomon Gusman and professor Lola Barsuk, who later became a translator and professor at the Azerbaijan University of Languages.

In 1970, he graduated from the Azerbaijan Pedagogical Institute of Foreign Languages, and three years later, in 1973, he completed his studies at the Baku Higher Party School. From 1973 to 1986, he served as the Deputy Chairman of the Committee of Youth Organizations of the Azerbaijan SSR in Baku. Subsequently, from 1986 to 1991, he held the positions of head of the information department and head of the press center of the Committee of Youth Organisations.

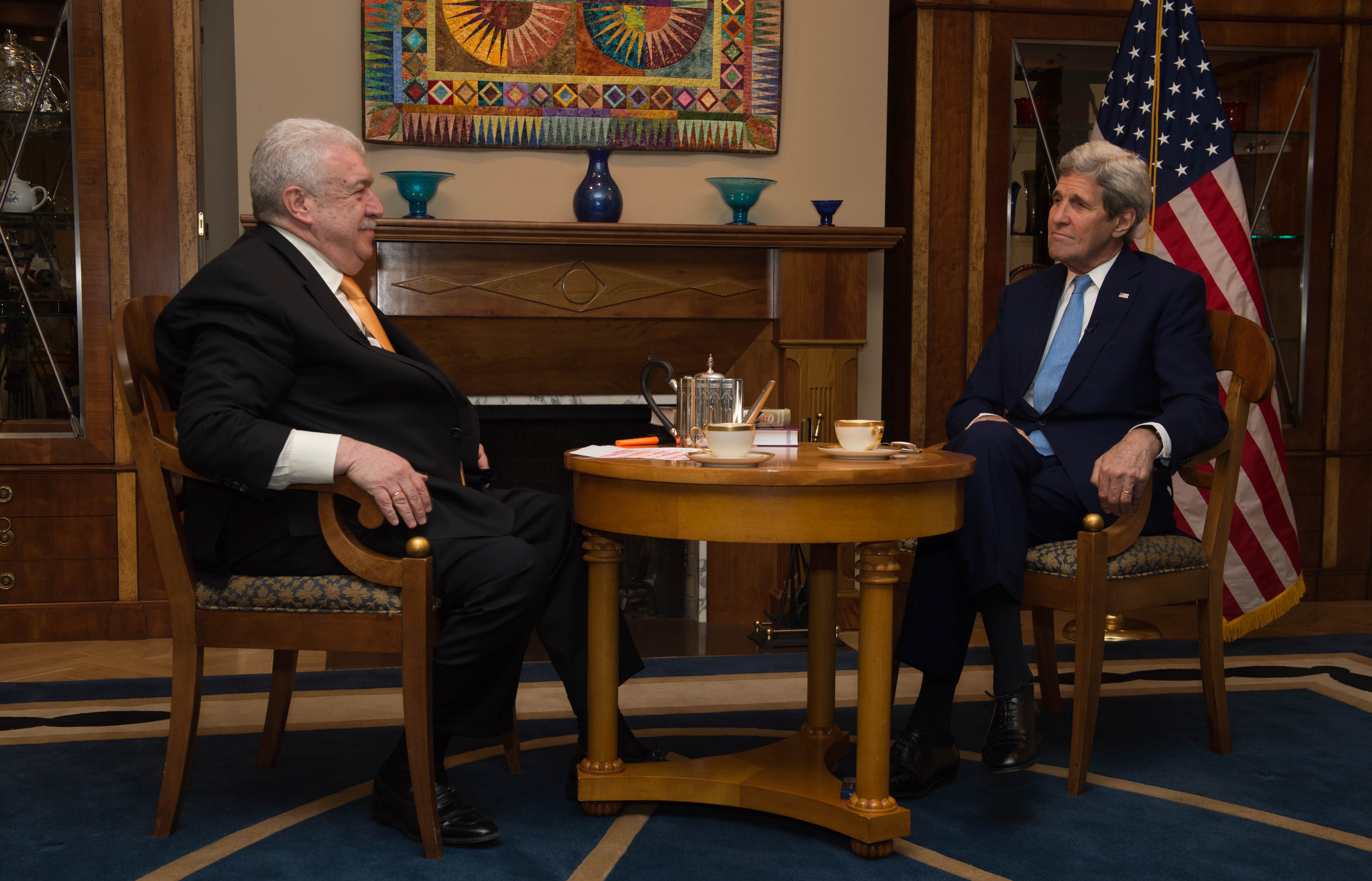
United States Secretary of State John Kerry Sits with Gusman before an interview in Moscow.

Between 1991 and 1995, he became the director of the General Directorate for Information Cooperation, known as "Infomol." Following this, he served as the vice-president of the international analytical agency "ANKOM-TASS" from 1995 to 1998. Later, in 1998 and 1999, he held the position of head of the Main Department of International Cooperation, Public Relations, and Special Projects at ITAR-TASS. From January to November 1999, he served as the Deputy General Director of ITAR-TASS. Since November 1999, he has been the First Deputy General Director of the TASS news agency (formerly known as ITAR-TASS until 1 October 2014). Notably, during his tenure, starting from 16 November 2000, he also hosted the "Formula of Power" interview program, where he conducted interviews with world leaders.

He is the Executive Secretary of the World Association of Russian Press (WARP), the Secretary General of the Organization of Asia-Pacific News Agencies (OANA), and the Vice President of the European Alliance of News Agencies (EANA). Gusman is also a member of the Moscow Union of Journalists.

Gusman was dismissed from his position as First Deputy General Director of TASS in July 2025 after he attended an event hosted by Ilham Aliyev, the President of Azerbaijan.

== Personal life ==
His older brother Yuli is an actor and film director who serves CEO of the Nika Award. He is married to Dzhema Gusman. His son Vadim (born 1978) has served as First Secretary at the Permanent Mission of Azerbaijan to UN.

== Honours ==
=== Russian ===
- Honored Journalist of the Russian Federation (2018)
- Medal "In Commemoration of the 1000th Anniversary of Kazan"
- Merited Worker of Culture of the Russian Federation (19 January 2001)
- State Prize of the Russian Federation in Literature and Art (5 June 2003)
- Gratitude from the Minister of Culture of the Russian Federation (19 January 2004)
- Order of Friendship (17 October 2005)
- Russian Federation Presidential Certificate of Honour (4 September 2009)
- Order "For Merit to the Fatherland" IV Class (22 January 2010)
- Badge of the Ministry of Foreign Affairs of Russia "For Contribution to International Cooperation" (2010)
- Order of Honour (22 April 2014)
- Gratitude from the Minister of Culture of the Russian Federation (2017).
- Russian Federation Presidential Certificate of Honour (30 May 2018)
- Merited Journalist of the Russian Federation (27 December 2018)
- Order "For Merit to the Fatherland" III Class (30 January 2020)
- Badge of the Russian Federation "For Contribution to Russian Culture" (2021, Ministry of Culture of the Russian Federation).

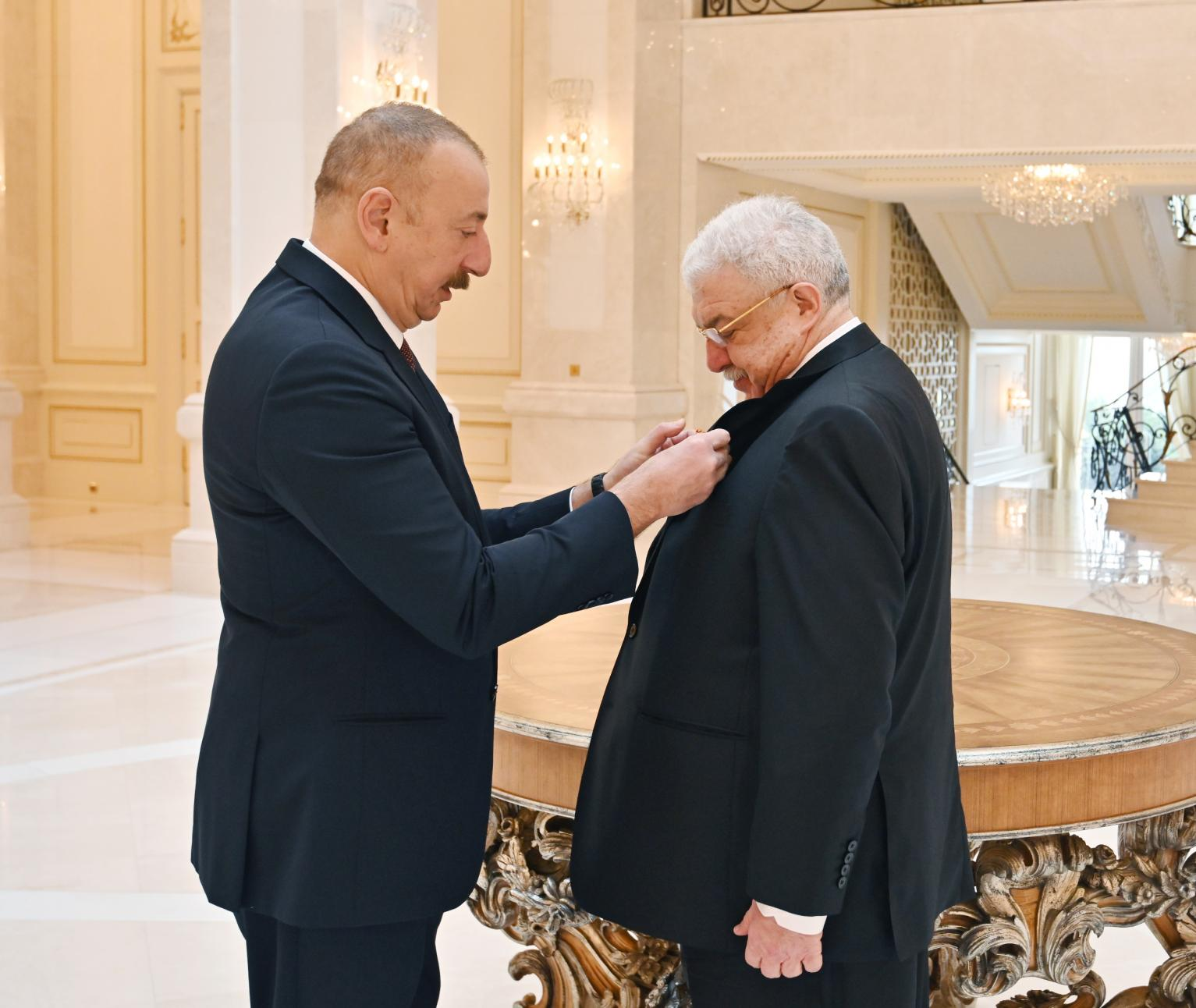
Gusman with Ilham Aliyev.

=== Foreign ===
- Shohrat Order (19 January 2005, Аzerbaijan)
- Dostlug Order (22 January 2010, Аzerbaijan)
- Order of Merit of the Italian Republic (13 January 2017, Italy)
- Sharaf Order (23 January 2020, Аzerbaijan)
- Order of Honour (24 January 2020, Moldova)
- Francysk Skaryna Medal (20 May 2020, Belarus)
- Order of Friendship (2021, Kazakhstan)
