= Mollakhana =

Traditional Muslim religious primary school

A mollakhana was a traditional Muslim religious primary school in Azerbaijan, which formed the basis of public education, especially under Tsarist Russia. These schools were often located in mosques, and by the 19th century, there were around 502 such institutions in major cities and provinces like Baku, Guba, Karabakh, and Sheki.

The education was typically strict and focused on religious studies. Students were taught by a ‘molla’ (a religious teacher) and were made to learn the Quran by heart in Arabic. The conditions were often harsh, and failure could result in physical punishment. The Azerbaijani poet Mikayil Mushfig (1908–1939), who attended one as a child, famously wrote an angry verse describing it: ‘I see children sitting on the damp ground... The ragged mat is filled with fleas...’

== Etymology ==
The word ‘Mollakhana’ is a combination of two words: ‘Molla’, a variant of ‘Mullah’ (a Muslim religious teacher) and ‘Khana’ (house). Thus, ‘Mollakhana’ literally means ‘House of the Mullah’.
