= Deaths in September 1992 =

The following is a list of notable deaths in September 1992.

Entries for each day are listed alphabetically by surname. A typical entry lists information in the following sequence:

- Name, age, country of citizenship at birth, subsequent country of citizenship (if applicable), reason for notability, cause of death (if known), and reference.

== September 1992 ==
=== 1 ===
- Desta Asgedom, 20, Ethiopian athlete, suicide.
- Morris Carnovsky, 94, American actor.
- Chick Harbert, 77, American golfer, stroke.
- Piotr Jaroszewicz, 82, Polish politician, prime minister (1970–1980), murdered.
- Montgomery Oliver Koelsch, 80, American circuit judge (United States Court of Appeals for the Ninth Circuit).
- Sergey Senyukov, 37, Soviet high jumper and Olympian (1976).
- Ivan Tregubov, 62, Soviet ice hockey player and Olympian (1956).

=== 2 ===
- Tahir Hasanov, 22, Azerbaijani soldier and war hero, killed in action.
- Nam Jeong-im, 47, South Korean actress, breast cancer.
- Sadeq Mallallah, 21-22, Saudi Arabian apostate, execution by beheading.
- Barbara McClintock, 90, American geneticist, Nobel Prize recipient (1983).
- Johnnie Mortimer, 61, English scriptwriter.
- Baltasar Sangchili, 80, Spanish boxer.
- Bert Zagers, 59, American gridiron football player (Washington Redskins).

=== 3 ===
- César Bengzon, 96, Filipino judge, Chief Justice of the Philippines (1961–1966).
- Bruno Bjelinski, 82, Croatian composer.
- Sherm Chavoor, 72-73, American swimming coach.
- Mahmoud Hessaby, 89, Iranian nuclear physicist and politician.
- Eli Mandel, 69, Canadian poet.
- P. Neelakantan, 75, Indian Tamil film director.
- Sirimathi Rasadari, 60, Sri Lankan actress.
- Joseph L. Rauh, Jr., 81, American civil rights and civil liberties lawyer.
- Bob Walton, 80, Canadian ice hockey player (Montreal Canadiens).

=== 4 ===
- Luis Cardoza y Aragón, 88, Guatemalan writer and diplomat.
- Dan Deșliu, 65, Romanian poet, drowned.
- Greg J. Holbrock, 86, American politician attorney and politician, member of the United States House of Representatives (1941-1943).
- Fakhraddin Najafov, 25, Azerbaijani soldier and war hero, killed in action.
- M. B. Ramachandra Rao, 86, Indian geophysicist.
- John Lewis Smith Jr., 79, American district judge (United States District Court for the District of Columbia).
- Eric Thompson, 53, Scottish cricketer.
- John van Dreelen, 70, Dutch actor.

=== 5 ===
- Harold Burry, 80, American football coach (Westminster College).
- Ng Liang Chiang, 71, Singaporean hurdler.
- Ron Davis, 50, American baseball player (Houston Colt .45s/Astros, St. Louis Cardinals, Pittsburgh Pirates).
- Billy Herman, 83, American Hall of Fame baseball player, cancer.
- Irving Allen Lee, 43, American actor (The Edge of Night), AIDS.
- Fritz Leiber, 81, American author (Fafhrd and the Gray Mouser), stroke.
- Yasuji Mori, 67, Japanese animator.
- Poul Moll Nielsen, 62, Danish Olympic field hockey player (1948, 1960).
- László Rajcsányi, 85, Hungarian fencer and Olympic champion (1936, 1948, 1952).
- Albert Rees, 71, American economist.
- Hal Russell, 66, American free jazz composer, band leader and multi-instrumentalist.
- Jens Arup Seip, 86, Norwegian historian.
- Christopher Trace, 59, English actor and television presenter (Blue Peter), cancer.
- Zhou Wennan, 82, Chinese revolutionary and judge.
- Hans-Peter Zimmer, 55, German artist.

=== 6 ===
- Ronnie Cahill, 77, American gridiron football player (Chicago Cardinals).
- John Ryan Davey, 78, Australian cricketer.
- Henry Ephron, 81, American screenwriter (Captain Newman, M.D., Carousel, Desk Set).
- Pat Harder, 70, American gridiron football player (Chicago Cardinals, Detroit Lions).
- Mervyn Johns, 93, Welsh actor.
- Ponjikara Raphi, 68, Indian Malayalam essayist, playwright, and novelist.
- John Sutton, 73, English geologist.

=== 7 ===
- Levan Abashidze, 29, Georgian actor and soldier, killed in battle.
- Cyril Bence, 89, Welsh toolmaker and politician.
- Arturo Dominici, 76, Italian actor.
- Gerald Hanley, 76, Irish novelist.
- Edward Kobyliński, 84, Polish rower and Olympic medalist (1932, 1936).
- Emilio Villalba Welsh, 86, Argentine screenwriter.
- Johannes Zoet, 83, Dutch Olympic fencer (1948).

=== 8 ===
- William Barrett, 79, American academic.
- Quentin N. Burdick, 84, American politician, member of the U.S. Senate (since 1960), heart failure.
- René Emanuelli, 86, French Olympic equestrian (1948).
- Guy Grantham, 92, British naval officer.
- Donald Guthrie, 76, British theologian and New Testament scholar.
- Hans-Otto Meissner, 83, German lawyer and nazi diplomat.
- Drew Thompson, 70, Canadian actor

=== 9 ===
- Maurice Burton, 94, British zoologist and science author.
- Julian Creus, 75, British weightlifter and Olympic medalist (1948, 1952, 1956).
- William E. DePuy, 72, American Army general.
- Carmelo Di Bella, 71, Italian football player.
- Ivo Fabris, 82, Yugoslavian Olympic rower (1936).
- Willie Fennell, 72, Australian actor, comedian and scriptwriter.
- Imre König, 91, Hungarian-British chess master.
- Orlando Santamaría, 72, Cuban Olympic sports shooter (1948).

=== 10 ===
- Louis Baes, 93, Belgian football player.
- Harold L. Humes, 66, American novelist and counterculture figure.
- Hanns Scharff, 84, German Luftwaffe interrogator.
- Ivar Sjölin, 73, Swedish freestyle wrestler and Olympic medalist (1948).
- Evelyn Wellings, 83, Egyptian-English cricket player and journalist.

=== 11 ===
- Else Germeten, 74, Norwegian film censor and politician.
- Abubakar Gumi, 67, Nigerian Islamic scholar, leukemia.
- Eiji Gō, 55, Japanese actor.
- Frank McKinney, 53, American Olympic swimmer (1956, 1960), plane crash.
- John Sanchez, 71, American football player (Detroit Lions, Washington Redskins, New York Giants).
- Frank Singuineau, 79, Trinidadian actor.

=== 12 ===
- Mary Wells Ashworth, 89, American historian, aortic rupture.
- Rowley Fischer, 82, Australian rules footballer.
- Hans F. Koenekamp, 100, American special effects artist and cinematographer.
- Mallikarjun Mansur, 81, Indian classical singer.
- Ruth Nelson, 87, American actress (3 Women, The Late Show, Awakenings), cancer.
- Ed Peck, 75, American actor (Happy Days, Bullitt, Major Dell Conway of the Flying Tigers), heart attack.
- Anthony Perkins, 60, American actor (Psycho, Friendly Persuasion, The Black Hole), AIDS.
- Emilio Recoba, 87, Uruguayan footballer.
- Ron Woodroof, 42, American entrepreneur and creator of the Dallas Buyer's Club, AIDS-related pneumonia.

=== 13 ===
- Dick Huffman, 69, American gridiron football player (Los Angeles Rams).
- Lou Jacobs, 89, German-American clown.
- Božidar Rašica, 79, Croatian architect, scenographer and painter.
- Arseny Semionov, 81, Soviet painter and art teacher.

=== 14 ===
- Montu Banerjee, 72, Indian cricketer.
- Libero Bertagnolli, 77, American football player (Chicago Cardinals), and coach.
- Somapala Dharmapriya, 51, Sri Lankan actor and cinematographer.
- Ilse Dörffeldt, 80, German sprinter and Olympian (1936).
- Johannes van der Horst, 83, Dutch Olympic modern pentathlete (1936).
- Bruce Hutchison, 91, Canadian writer and journalist.
- August Komendant, 85, Estonian-American structural engineer.
- Paul Martin Sr., 89, Canadian politician.
- George Pearcy, 73, American basketball player.
- Gian Luca Tocchi, 91, Italian composer.
- Theodore S. Weiss, 64, American politician, member of the U.S. House of Representatives (since 1977), heart failure.

=== 15 ===
- Martin Eberle, 61, German Olympic weightlifter (1964).
- Pedro Formental, 77, Cuban-American baseball player.
- Harvey Hardy, 69, American gridiron football player.
- Fredrik Hetty, 87, Norwegian footballer.
- Walter B. Jones, Sr., 79, American politician, member of the U.S. House of Representatives (since 1966).
- Michael Luciano, 83, American film editor (The Dirty Dozen, The Longest Yard, The Flight of the Phoenix).
- Håkon Olsen, 65, Norwegian Olympic wrestler (1952).
- Shubbo Shankar, 50, Indian graphic artist, musician and composer, pneumonia.

=== 16 ===
- Larbi Benbarek, 75, French-Moroccan football player.
- Millicent Fenwick, 82, American politician, member of the United States House of Representatives (1975-1983), heart failure.
- Mogens Koch, 94, Danish architect.
- Eldred Kraemer, 62, American football player (San Francisco 49ers).
- Henri Legay, 72, French operatic tenor.
- Al Piasecky, 75, American football player (Washington Redskins).
- Tsuneo Sato, 66, Japanese Olympic speed skater (1952).
- Joe Stringfellow, 74, American football player (Detroit Lions).
- Jim Sullivan, 60, Northern Irish politician and republican.
- Victoria Wolf, 88, German-American writer.

=== 17 ===
- Homayoun Ardalan, 42, Iranian Kurd politician, assassinated.
- Yngve Casslind, 60, Swedish Olympic ice hockey player (1956).
- Feodor Chaliapin Jr., 86, Russian-Italian actor.
- George Hill, 85, American figure skater and Olympian (1936).
- Herivelto Martins, 80, Brazilian composer and singer.
- Ralph Schwarz, 25, Dutch Olympic rower (1988), plane crash.
- Sadegh Sharafkandi, 54, Iranian Kurd politician, assassinated.
- Judith Nisse Shklar, 63, Latvian-American political theorist.
- Roger Wagner, 78, American musician.

=== 18 ===
- Heinz Ambühl, 87, Swiss Olympic sports shooter (1948).
- Lona Andre, 77, American actress, golfer, and businesswoman, in 1938, Andre set a world golfing record for women by shooting 156 holes of golf in 11 hours and 56 minutes on the Lake Norconian, California course
- David Bodian, 82, American medical scientist, Parkinson's disease.
- Darío Cabanelas, 75, Spanish Arabist.
- Princess Margaret of Denmark, 97, Danish royal.
- Kevin Hanrahan, 39, American mobster (Patriarca crime family), shot.
- Mohammad Hidayatullah, 86, Indian lawyer and Chief Justice.
- Gustav Lombard, 97, German SS general during World War II.
- Werner E. Reichardt, 68, German physicist and biologist.
- Herbert W. Spencer, 87, Chilean-American film and television composer and orchestrator.
- Earl Van Dyke, 62, American soul musician, prostate cancer.

=== 19 ===
- Fritz Bauer, 86, German coxswain and Olympic champion (1928, 1932, 1936).
- Frederick Combs, 56, American actor (The Boys in the Band), AIDS.
- Sir Geraint Evans, 70, Welsh opera singer.
- Kenny Howard, 63, American motorcycle mechanic, artist, and gunsmith.
- Aida Imanguliyeva, 52, Azerbaijani scholar, cancer.
- Jacques Pic, 59, French chef, heart attack.
- Keith Stackpole, 76, Australian football player.
- Alexander Trojan, 78, Austrian film actor.
- Wu Zhonghua, 75, Chinese physicist, pioneer of three-dimensional flow theory.

=== 20 ===
- Musa Anter, 72, Turkish Kurd writer, journalist and intellectual, assassinated.
- Joe Fillmore, 78, American baseball player.
- Leon O. Jacobson, 80, American physician, medical researcher and educator.
- Reuben Kadish, 79, American visual artist.
- André Peton, 89, French cyclist.
- Gösta Pihl, 85, Swedish Olympic sports shooter (1952).
- Harry Smyth, 82, Canadian speed skater and Olympian (1932).
- William L. Springer, 83, American politician, member of the U.S. House of Representatives (1951–1973).

=== 21 ===
- Aleksandr Almetov, 52, Russian ice hockey player and Olympian (1960, 1964), pneumonia.
- Tarachand Barjatya, 78, Indian film producer.
- Paul de Metternich-Winneburg, 75, German-Austrian racing driver.
- Harry J. Sonneborn, 77, American businessman and first president of McDonald's, diabetes.
- Bill Williams, 77, American actor (The Adventures of Kit Carson), brain tumor, brain cancer.

=== 22 ===
- Candido Amantini, 78, Italian Roman Catholic priest, theologian and exorcist.
- Paul Bucy, 87, American neurosurgeon.
- James Demouchette, 37, American convicted murderer, execution by lethal injection.
- Kurt Haas, 83, Swiss Olympic rower (1936).
- Aurelio López, 44, Mexican baseball player, traffic collision.
- Aruna Shanthi, 66, Sri Lankan actor.

=== 23 ===
- Frank P. Briggs, 98, American politician, member of the U.S. Senate (1945–1947).
- Paul E. Garber, 93, American museum curator.
- Ivar Ivask, 64, Estonian poet.
- Mary Santpere, 79, Spanish actress.
- Kalyan Sundaram, 88, Indian civil servant.
- Glendon Swarthout, 74, American novelist, pulmonary emphysema.
- James A. Van Fleet, 100, American Army general.

=== 24 ===
- Christiane Barry, 74, French actress.
- Roy Heffernan, 67, Australian professional wrestler, heart attack.
- Jørgen Hval, 81, Norwegian footballer.
- Rufus Ligon, 89, American baseball player.
- Pietro Magni, 73, Italian football player and manager.
- Sarv Mittra Sikri, 84, Indian judge and Chief Justice.
- Brownie Wise, 79, American pioneering saleswoman (Tupperware).

=== 25 ===
- Igor Bakalov, 52, Soviet Olympic sports shooter (1964, 1972).
- Tibor Kemény, 79, Hungarian football player and coach.
- César Manrique, 73, Spanish artist, traffic collision.
- Ivan Vdović, 31, Serbian drummer, AIDS.

=== 26 ===
- Suimenkul Chokmorov, 52, Soviet-Kyrgyz film actor.
- David Cock, 77, English cricketer.
- Ralph Davis, 70, American football player (Green Bay Packers).
- Pancrazio De Pasquale, 67, Italian politician.
- Erich Krempel, 79, German Olympic sport shooter (1936).
- John Kokinai, 41, Papua New Guinean Olympic long distance runner (1976).
- Luka Lipošinović, 59, Yugoslavian Olympic football player (1956).
- Ralph Manheim, 85, American translator, prostate cancer.
- Frank Patrick, 76, American gridiron football player (Chicago Cardinals).
- Charlie Priestley, 76, Australian rules footballer.
- Oiva Virtanen, 63, Finnish Olympic basketball player (1952).
- Aleksandr Voronin, 41, Russian weightlifter and Olympic champion (1976), fall.

=== 27 ===
- H. E. P. de Mel, 85, Sri Lankan politician, member of parliament of Ceylon.
- Hugh Llewellyn Keenleyside, 94, Canadian diplomat, academic, and civil servant.
- Charles Kramer, 84, American economist.
- Zhang Leping, 81, Chinese comic artist.
- Jacques-Paul Martin, 84, French Roman Catholic cardinal.
- Brian Mock, 45, American murder victim
- Hermann Neuberger, 72, German football official.
- Keith Prentice, 52, American actor (The Boys in the Band, Dark Shadows, Cruising), AIDS-related cancer.
- Peter Riedl, 82, Austrian Olympic water polo player (1936).
- Hal Smith, 90, American baseball player (Pittsburgh Pirates).

=== 28 ===
- Jan Bosman, 46, Dutch Olympic judoka (1972).
- António Rodrigo Pinto da Silva, 80, Portuguese botanist and taxonomist.
- William Douglas-Home, 80, British playwright.
- John Leech, 66, British mathematician.
- Olli Lehtinen, 77, Finnish Olympic boxer (1948).
- Johanna Piesch, 94, Austrian mathematician.
- Rupak Raj Sharma, 38, Nepali footballer and FIFA referee (Nepal national football Team), plane crash.
- Hu Qiaomu, 80, Chinese sociologist, marxist philosopher and politician.

=== 29 ===
- Jean Aurenche, 88, French screenwriter.
- Paul Jabara, 44, American songwriter ("Last Dance", "It's Raining Men"), AIDS.
- Bill Rowe, 61, English sound engineer (The Last Emperor, The Killing Fields, Batman), Oscar winner (1988).
- Kálmán Szepesi, 62, Hungarian table tennis player.

=== 30 ===
- Willie Adams, 80, American basketball player.
- Nate Borden, 60, American gridiron football player (Green Bay Packers, Dallas Cowboys, Buffalo Bills), cancer.
- Russ Hunt, 81, Canadian Olympic cyclist (1932).
- Robert Joel, 48, American actor (A Very Natural Thing), AIDS.
- Erwin Klein, 54, American table tennis player, shot.
- Maria Malicka, 94, Polish stage and film actress.

== Sources ==
- Liebman, Roy (2000). The Wampas Baby Stars: A Biographical Dictionary, 1922–1934. Jefferson, North Carolina: McFarland. ISBN 0-7864-0756-5.
