= Najafov =

Najafov is a surname. Notable people with the surname include:

- Fakhraddin Najafov (1967–1992), National Hero of Azerbaijan
- Fariz Najafov (born 1978), Azerbaijani karateka
- Fazil Najafov (1935–2023), Azerbaijani artist
- Huseyn Najafov (1907–1967), Azerbaijani politician
- Khayal Najafov (born 1997), Azerbaijani footballer
- Yunis Najafov (1967–1992), National Hero of Azerbaijan
