= Zoet =

Zoet is a Dutch surname. Notable people with the surname include:

- Bart Zoet (1942–1992), Dutch cyclist
- Jan Zoet (1958–2024), Dutch theatre director
- Jeroen Zoet (born 1991), Dutch footballer
- Jim Zoet (born 1953), Canadian basketball player who played in the National Basketball Association
- Johannes Zoet (1908–1992), Dutch fencer
