= Tahir Hasanov =

National Hero of Azerbaijan

- Tahir Həsənov
- Born: February 22, 1970; Baku, Azerbaijan SSR
- Died: September 2, 1992 (aged 22); Çıldıran, Kalbajar District, Azerbaijan
- Military career
- Allegiance: Azerbaijan
- Branch: Azerbaijani Armed Forces
- Service years: 1991-1992
- Conflicts: First Nagorno-Karabakh War
- Awards: National Hero of Azerbaijan; 1992

Tahir Tofiq oglu Hasanov (Azerbaijani: Tahir Həsənov) (22 February 1970 – 2 September 1992) was an Azerbaijani soldier who was posthumously awarded the title National Hero of Azerbaijan for his service during the First Nagorno-Karabakh War.

== Early life and education ==
Hasanov was born on February 22, 1970, in Baku, Azerbaijan SSR. In 1987, he completed his secondary education at Nasimi raion secondary school No 23. From 1988 through 1990, Hasanov served in the Soviet Armed Forces. In 1990, he entered Baku State University. When Armenians attacked the territories of Azerbaijan, Hasanov left his education unfinished and went to the frontlines.

=== Personal life ===
Hasanov was single.

== First Nagorno-Karabakh war ==
Hasanov was appointed the commander of the intelligence service. He participated in military operations around Agdara, Bashkent, Meshali and Chyldyran. On September 2, 1992, a detachment in which Hasanov served, took up a position near the village of Chyldyran of the Aghdara district, controlled by the armed forces of Armenia. He led one of the three groups, two of which during the operation came across ambushes and were forced to retreat. Hasanov was wounded in a fight with Armenian soldiers. They attempted to capture him alive. At the last moment, Hasanov blew himself up with a grenade and killed several Armenian soldiers. On 29 September 1992, his body was brought to Baku and buried at a Martyrs' Lane cemetery.

== Honors ==
Tahir Tofiq oglu Hasanov was posthumously awarded the title of the "National Hero of Azerbaijan" by Presidential Decree No. 273 dated 19 October 1992. He was buried at a Martyrs' Lane cemetery in Baku. A school where he studied in Nasimi raion of Baku was named after him.

== See also ==
- First Nagorno-Karabakh War
- List of National Heroes of Azerbaijan

== Sources ==
- Vugar Asgarov. Azərbaycanın Milli Qəhrəmanları (Yenidən işlənmiş II nəşr). Bakı: "Dərələyəz-M", 2010, səh. 117.
