= Antonio Marguccio =

Australian weightlifter

Personal information
- Nationality: Australian
- Born: 24 May 1940 (age 84)

Sport
- Sport: Weightlifting

Antonio Marguccio (born 24 May 1940) is an Australian weightlifter. He competed in the men's featherweight event at the 1964 Summer Olympics.
