= Enar Edberg =

Swedish weightlifter

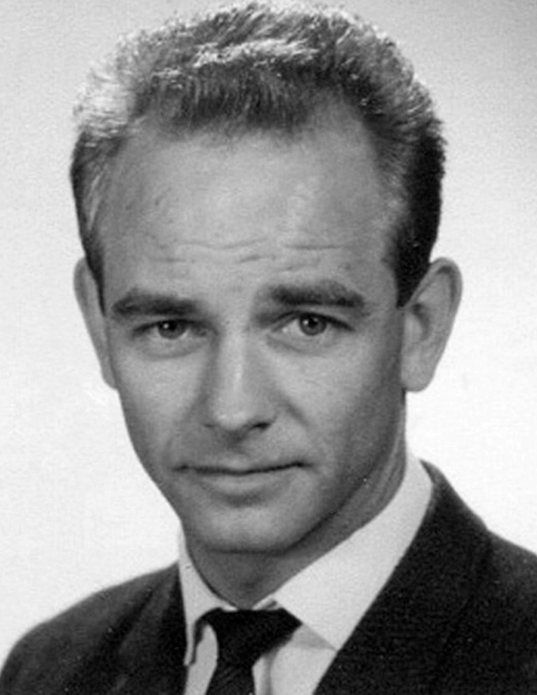

Personal information
- Nationality: Swedish
- Born: 9 July 1936 Stockholm, Sweden
- Died: 9 February 2013 (aged 76) Stockholm, Sweden
- Height: 1.62 cm (1 in)

Sport
- Sport: Weightlifting
- Club: Stockholms Spårvägars GIF
Medal record
Representing Sweden
European Championships
Bronze medal – third place	1958 Stockholm	-56 kg

Sven Enar Edberg (9 July 1936 – 9 February 2013) was a Swedish weightlifter. He won a bronze medal at the 1958 European Championships and placed 20th at the 1964 Olympics, in the featherweight event.
