= Weightlifting at the 1964 Summer Olympics – Men's 60 kg =

Weightlifting at the Olympics

Men's 60 kg at the Games of the XVIII Olympiad
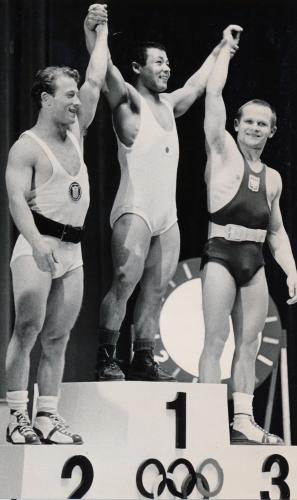
- Medal winners
- Venue: Shibuya Public Hall
- Date: 12 October 1964
- Competitors: 22 from 20 nations
- Winning total: 397.5 kg WR

Medalists
1st place, gold medalist(s)		Yoshinobu Miyake	Japan
2nd place, silver medalist(s)		Isaac Berger	United States
3rd place, bronze medalist(s)		Mieczysław Nowak	Poland

The men's 60 kg weightlifting competitions at the 1964 Summer Olympics in Tokyo took place on 12 October at the Shibuya Public Hall. It was the tenth appearance of the featherweight class.

== Results ==
Rank	Name	Country	kg
1	Yoshinobu Miyake	Japan	397.5
2	Isaac Berger	United States	382.5
3	Mieczysław Nowak	Poland	377.5
4	Hiroshi Fukuda	Japan	375.0
5	Sebastiano Mannironi	Italy	370.0
6	Kim Hae-nam	South Korea	367.5
7	Rudolf Kozłowski	Poland	357.5
8	Hosni Abbas	Egypt	342.5
9	Ildefonso Lee	Panama	340.0
10	Chung Kum Weng	Malaysia	335.0
11	Martin Eberle	United Team of Germany	335.0
12	Pedro Serrano	Puerto Rico	332.5
13	Laxmi Kanta Das	India	332.5
14	Zuhair Elia Mansour	Iraq	330.0
15	George Newton	Great Britain	325.0
16	Chang Ming-chung	Chinese Taipei	322.5
17	Mauro Alanís	Mexico	315.0
18	Allen Salter	Canada	312.5
19	Antonio Marguccio	Australia	307.5
20	Enar Edberg	Sweden	305.0
AC	Balaș Fitzi	Romania	115.0
AC	Sanun Tiamsert	Thailand	175.0
