= First Unitarian Church of Rochester (building) =

Church in New York, United States

- U.S. National Register of Historic Places
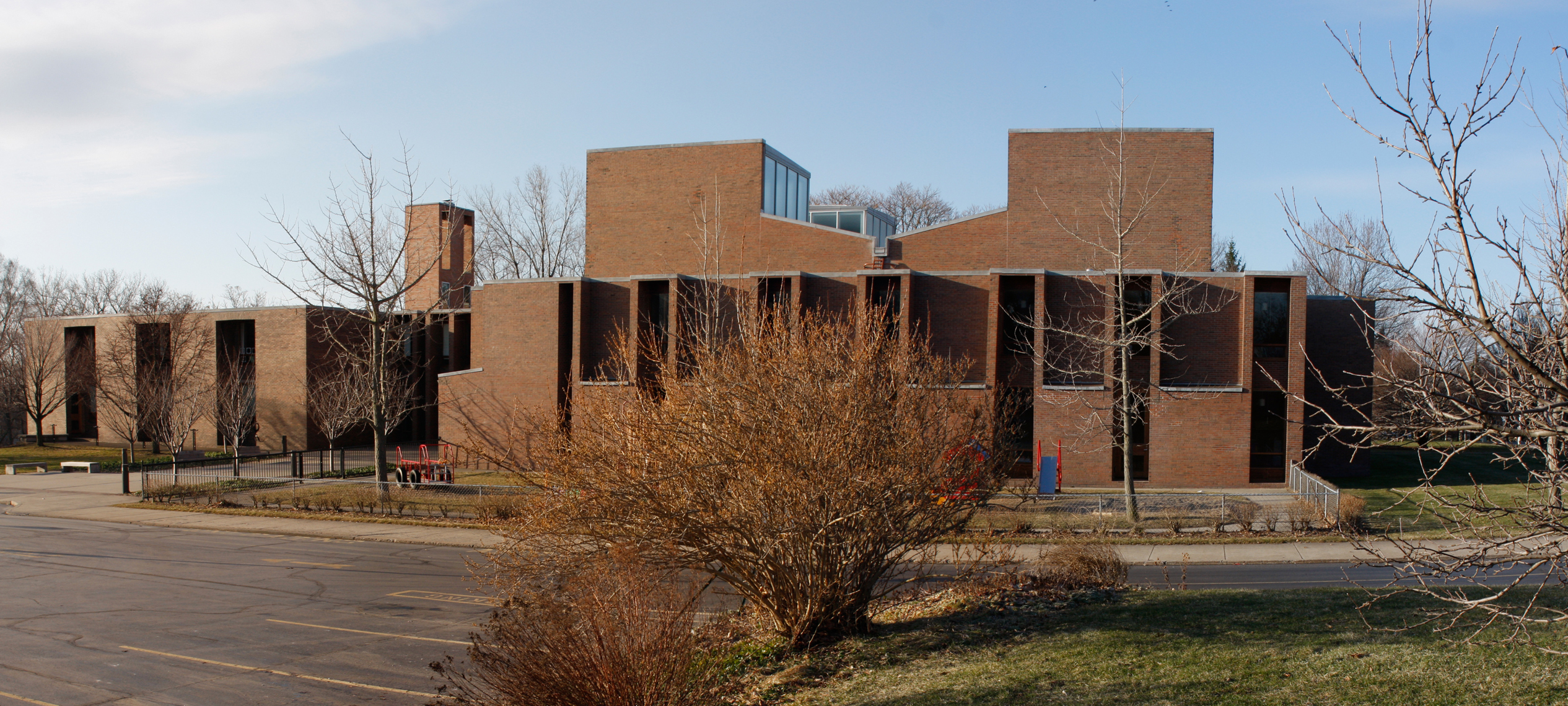
- North facade

- Location within New York
- Location: 220 S. Winton Road., Rochester, New York
- Coordinates: 43°08′28″N 77°33′26″W
- Area: 8 acres (3.2 ha)
- Built: 1962; major addition completed in 1969, small addition completed in 1996
- Architect: Louis I. Kahn
- Architectural style: Modern
- NRHP reference No.: 14000537
- Added to NRHP: September 2, 2014

The First Unitarian Church of Rochester building is located at 220 Winton Road South in Rochester, New York, U.S. Designed by Louis Kahn for the First Unitarian Church of Rochester, a Unitarian Universalist Association congregation, it was completed in 1962. Kahn completed a major extension to the building in 1969. Another small addition was completed in 1996.

The building was described in 1982 as one of "the most significant works of religious architecture of this century" by Paul Goldberger, a Pulitzer-Prize-winning architectural critic. Its exterior is characterized by deeply folded brick walls created by a series of thin, two-story light hoods that shield windows from direct sunlight. The sanctuary's complex ceiling has light towers in each corner to bring in indirect natural light.

The story of the design process that Kahn followed at First Unitarian has been described as "almost classic in architectural history and theory". Kahn began by creating what he called a Form drawing to represent the essence of what he intended to build. He drew a square to represent the sanctuary, and around the square he drew concentric circles to indicate an ambulatory, a corridor, and the church school. In the center he placed a question mark to represent his understanding that, in his words, "the form realization of Unitarian activity was bound around that which is Question. Question eternal of why anything."

== Background ==
The congregation of First Unitarian Church of Rochester voted in January 1959 to sell its existing building in downtown in Rochester, New York, with the understanding that they could continue to occupy it until July 1961. Construction activity by the developers who bought it, however, soon weakened the building, forcing the congregation to move in September, 1959. The church held Sunday services at the a temporary location until a new building could be constructed.

First Unitarian's previous building was architecturally significant, having been designed by Richard Upjohn, a prominent nineteenth-century architect and the first president of the American Institute of Architects. The church decided to replace it with a building designed "by a leading 20th century architect, giving the community a notable example of contemporary architecture."

== Choosing an architect ==
The search committee, formed of church members who were knowledgeable about architecture, decided to focus on prominent architects who had established relatively small offices and did most of the creative work themselves. They contacted six architects. Frank Lloyd Wright expressed little interest and his fees were high. (Wright died shortly afterward at the age of 91.) Eero Saarinen was considered but was unable to take the job because of his time constraints. The committee also met with Paul Rudolph, Walter Gropius, and Carl Koch. They spent a day with Louis Kahn in May 1959 and were impressed by his philosophical approach, the atmosphere in his office, the assurance that he would personally be in charge of the design, his respect for the integrity of materials, and the perception that his architecture, while modern, had an emotional depth and a connection to the past.

Robin B. Williams, writing in Louis I. Kahn: In the Realm of Architecture, says Kahn appealed to them also because of "the high compatibility of his philosophy with Unitarian ideas". Robert McCarter, one of Kahn's biographers, notes parallels between Kahn's ideas and those in the Essays of Ralph Waldo Emerson, a transcendalist who was an important figure in Unitarian history. Committee members said they were convinced that Kahn was "a natural Unitarian." Kahn, who came from a non-observant Jewish background, was spiritual in a way that been described as "pan-religious" by Carter Wiseman, one of his biographers. When working on projects in India and Bangladesh, for example, he developed an affinity with the spirituality he found there. Kahn's architecture reflected his spirituality. David Rineheart, who worked for Kahn, said, "for Lou, every building was a temple. Salk was a temple for science. Dhaka was a temple for government. Exeter was a temple for learning."

Kahn's social and political outlook also was compatible with that of the Rochester congregation and its history of concern with social issues. During the Great Depression Kahn worked with labor unions and civic agencies to design inexpensive housing. He worked as assistant architect on the Jersey Homesteads, a project to resettle Jewish garment workers from New York City and Philadelphia to a kibbutz-like rural collective that combined farming and manufacturing. During the presidential election of 1948, Kahn worked with the third-party campaign of Henry A. Wallace, who ran on the Progressive Party ticket.

Kahn gave a philosophical presentation of his ideas to a congregational meeting in June 1959, after which the church commissioned him to design their new building. During that same visit Kahn helped choose the site to be purchased for the new building. The church hired Kahn just as his career was entering a new stage that would bring him increased attention. Later that year Kahn was chosen to design the Salk Institute, and in 1962 he was selected to design the National Assembly complex for what would become the capital of the new nation of Bangladesh.

== Design process ==
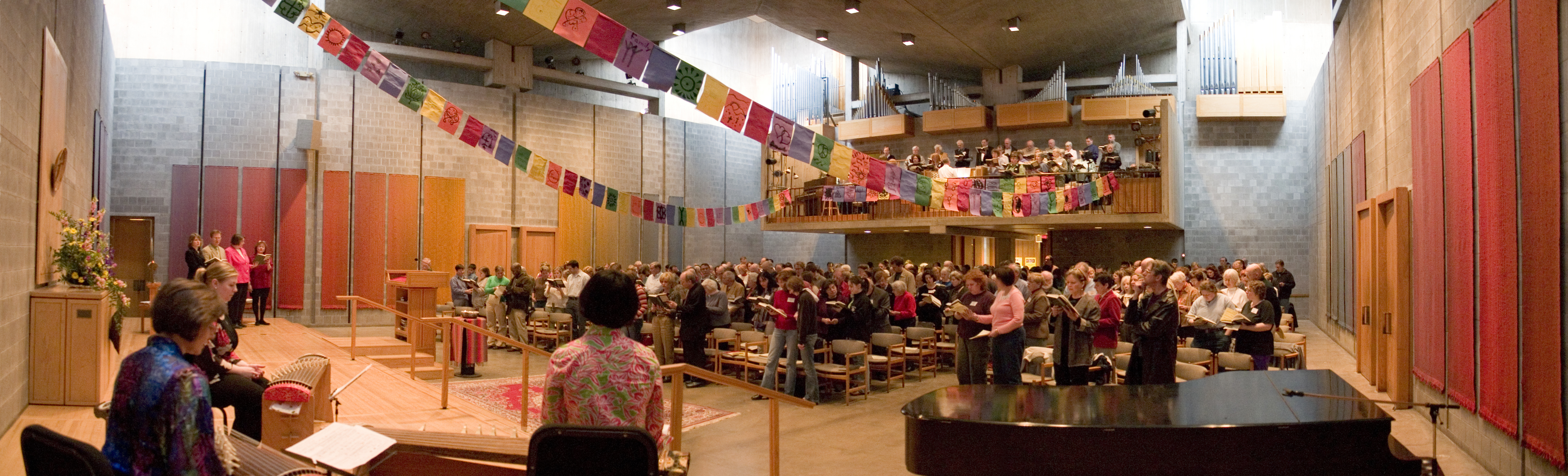
Sanctuary of First Unitarian Church of Rochester

The story of the design process at First Unitarian, including Kahn's creation of what he called a Form drawing, "is almost classic in architectural history and theory" according to Katrine Lotz, a professor at the School of Architecture of the Royal Danish Academy of Fine Arts.

Kahn's approach was to design each building as if it were the first of its kind. August Komendant, a structural engineer who worked closely with Kahn, said that during the initial design stages Kahn wrestled with questions like "How would one design a Unitarian Church? What is the Unitarian religion?" and studied Unitarianism thoroughly. The result sometimes confounded expectations. When the completed First Unitarian Church was shown at an architectural exhibition in the Soviet Union, the mayor of Leningrad commented that it did not look like a church. (Kahn jokingly responded, "That's why it was chosen for exhibition in the Soviet Union.")

The church's building committee provided Kahn with information from questionnaires filled out by church members to indicate what they desired from their new building. These questionnaires went beyond normal fact-gathering about functional requirements to include aspects of the Unitarian faith that the building should express. Among other things, they said, the new building should be supportive of the broader community and should express "the dignity rather than the depravity of man."

The congregation's broad approach to the statement of requirements was similar to Kahn's philosophical approach to architectural design. Kahn explained this approach in Form and Design, an article he wrote while working on this project. Using the First Unitarian Church of Rochester as an example, Kahn said, "A great building, in my opinion, must begin with the unmeasurable, must go through measurable means when it is being designed and in the end must be unmeasurable ... But what is unmeasurable is the psychic spirit." Kahn associated the unmeasurable with what he called Form, saying that, "Form is not design, not a shape, not a dimension. It is not a material thing." "Form ... characterizes a harmony of spaces good for a certain activity of man."

When Kahn addressed the congregational meeting that voted to hire him, he explained his approach by creating what he called a Form drawing, which, he said, was not to be understood as an architectural design. He drew a square that represented the sanctuary, and around the square he placed concentric circles representing an ambulatory, a corridor and the church school. In the center of the square he placed a question mark that, he explained on another occasion, represented his understanding that "the form realization of Unitarian activity was bound around that which is Question. Question eternal of why anything."

Kahn delivered his first design in December 1959, proposing a square building three stories high with four-story towers in each corner. The sanctuary was a square area in the middle of a large twelve-sided room at the center of the building. The remainder of the near-circular room was an ambulatory space that was to be screened from the sanctuary. Kahn said, "The ambulatory I felt necessary because the Unitarian Church is made up of people who have had previous beliefs ... So I drew the ambulatory to respect the fact that what is being said or what is felt in a sanctuary was not necessarily something you have to participate in. And so you could walk and feel free to walk away from what is being said." Kahn had developed the idea for this type of ambulatory prior to his work on First Unitarian, referring to it during a talk in 1957 in the context of a university chapel. The central room was to be capped by a complex dome and encircled by a corridor outside its walls that would provide connections to the three-story church school on the periphery of the building. Pupils in the school would be able to observe church services from open spaces above.

Prompted by complaints about the cost, which was several times the amount that had been budgeted, Kahn quickly dropped one story from the proposed building. The committee, however, was also unhappy with other aspects of the design, such as its inflexibility and shortage of useful classroom space, the irregularly shaped rooms on the periphery created by the placement of a large, near-circular room within a square building, and the potential for services to be disturbed by children listening above and by people drifting in and out of the sanctuary. In February 1960, Helen Williams, the chair of the building committee, wrote to Kahn saying "we are not in any measure happy with the present concept which you have given us," and a week later she wrote, "We remain steadfast in the conclusion that we must have an entirely new concept". Stating that "Kahn has failed us miserably", Williams resigned in frustration from the building committee shortly afterward.

Kahn agreed to create a new design, much to the relief of the building committee, who feared that he would demand payment for work performed and walk away from the commission. For his new design Kahn proposed a building that was loosely elongated rather than rigidly square. He resisted suggestions to place classrooms in a separate wing to reduce the potential for services to be disturbed by boisterous children, retaining the concept of surrounding the sanctuary with the church school. Kahn eliminated the ambulatory space inside the sanctuary walls but retained the corridor just outside to provide access to the classrooms.

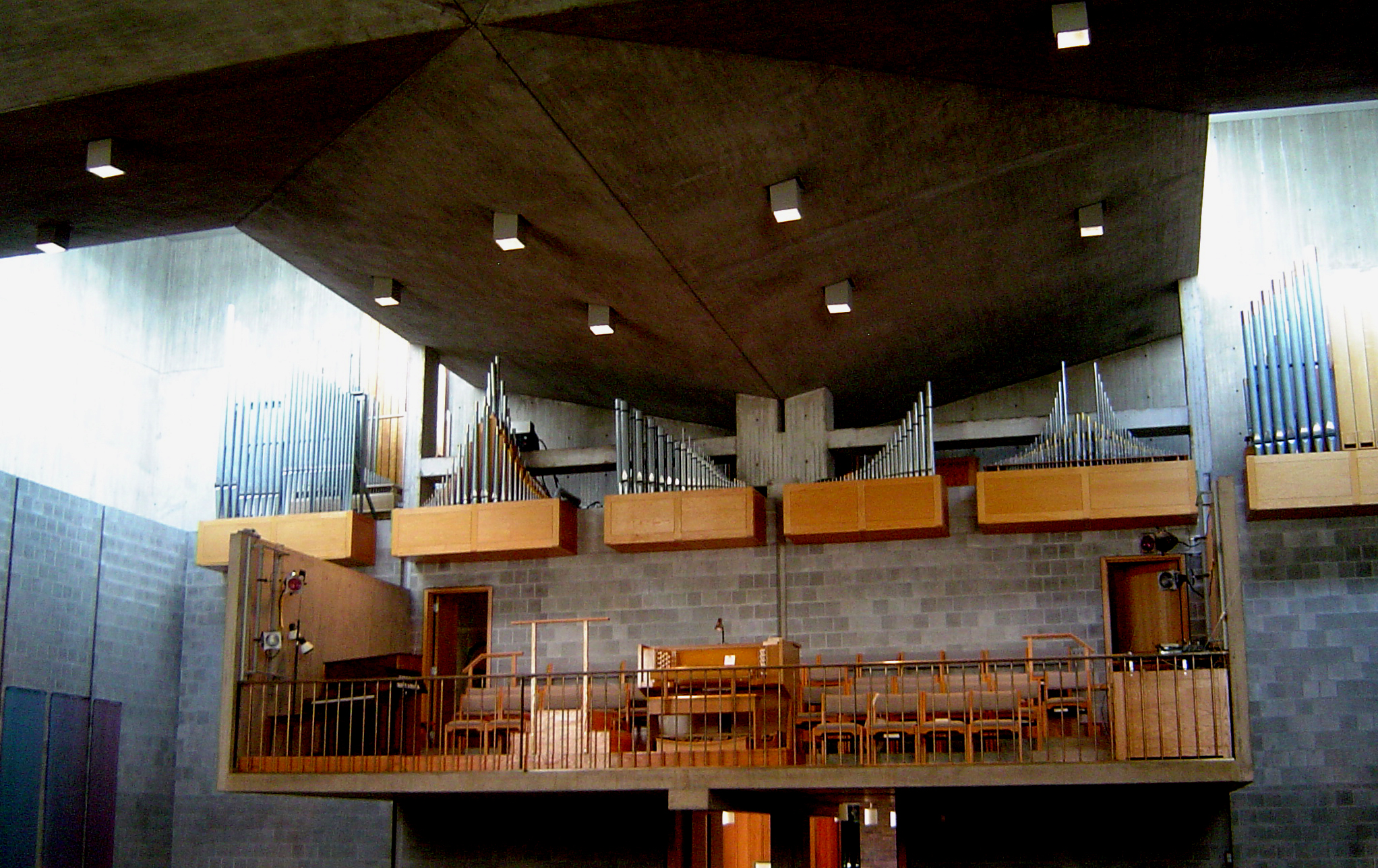
Sanctuary, with choir loft, ceiling structure, and light towers

The roof over the sanctuary was one of the last aspects of the design to be completed. One option would have been to span the sanctuary with a steel frame, but Kahn had decided in the early 1950s that he would no longer use such structures, preferring the more monumental appearance he could achieve with materials like concrete and brick. Not entirely satisfied with the roof design he had developed, Kahn asked August Komendant for suggestions. Komendant, his most important collaborator, was a structural engineer and a pioneer in the use of pre-stressed concrete, which can be used to create lighter and more graceful structures than regular concrete. Komendant kept Kahn's general layout of the roof but redesigned it as a folded-plate structure of pre-stressed concrete that would require support only at its edges, eliminating the need for the massive concrete beams that Kahn had been planning to use as supports for the roof structure.

During the design process, Kahn and the church developed a relationship of close collaboration. The congregation sometimes contributed to the process at a detailed level. One member built a scale model of the building and used it to conduct photometric studies of light levels in the proposed sanctuary. Kahn initially planned to bring natural light into the sanctuary through light slits in an array of concrete caps on the roof, but the building committee calculated that each cap would weigh 33 tons (30,000 kg), creating problems of support. The light towers in Kahn's final design are glazed only on their inner sides, a suggestion that originated with the committee. The committee notified Kahn that their calculations of acoustical resonance in the proposed light shafts indicated the possibility of problems in that area.

The new design was overwhelmingly approved by the congregation in August 1960. At the dedication of the new building in December 1962, Kahn talked about the relationship between architecture and religion. Komendant said, "He told me that in his speech he described the cathedrals, whose size and height was intended to show God's greatness and might and man's lowness, so that men would be frightened and obey His laws. For this church he used atmosphere and beauty to create respect and understanding for God's aims, kindness, and forgiveness."

== Exterior ==
The exterior of the building is characterized by deeply folded brick walls created by a series of thin, two-story light hoods that help shield windows from direct sunlight. Between the light hoods on the ground floor are projections of the building that enclose bench seats in the interior. Small windows on each side of the bench seats allow additional indirect light into the rooms. These projections impart a dual character to the light hoods, giving the upper part of each the appearance of an object, a light hood, and the lower part the appearance of a void, the space between two projections. The light hoods create a series of shadows on the exterior wall that are reminiscent of a row of columns, their vertical lines adding to the impression of height. The main entrance to the building is not visible to people passing by on the street.

Light towers in each of the four corners of the sanctuary rise above the building's outer walls, making the shape of the sanctuary easy to visualize from outside. The impression that Kahn created of the sanctuary imbedded within the larger building is similar to the "box within a box" approach he used in several other buildings, notably the Phillips Exeter Academy Library.

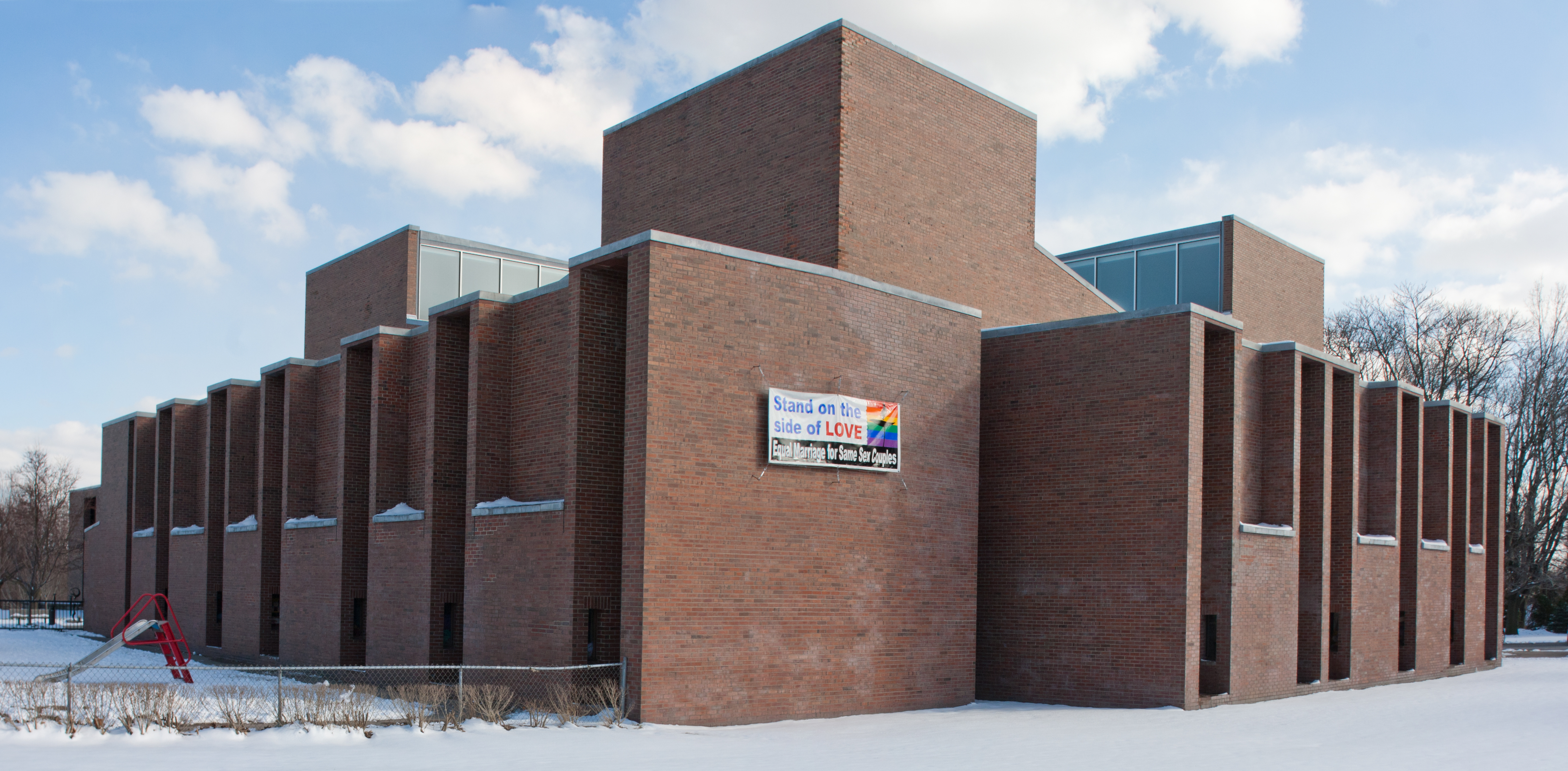
Northwest corner of First Unitarian

The building echoes the design of the Scottish castles that fascinated Kahn, particularly Comlongon Castle, whose floor plan is reproduced in two different scholarly discussions of First Unitarian. Comlongon Castle has a single large room in its center surrounded by walls that are 20 feet (6.1 m) thick. Those unusually thick walls made it possible to carve entire secondary rooms from within them, in effect making them inhabited walls. In the case of First Unitarian, the large central room is the sanctuary, and the "inhabited walls" can be perceived as the surrounding two floors of rooms. The windows of these rooms are recessed so deeply as to be unnoticed when viewed from an angle, and the building's indented corner spaces are windowless, all of which adds to the perception that the sanctuary is surrounded by massive, rugged walls. In Kahn's words, "the school became the walls which surrounded the question."

The church hired Kahn in 1964 to design an addition, which was completed in 1969. Its exterior is relatively unarticulated, in contrast to the sculpted walls of the original building. Built on a slope, it has two main floors and a lower level at its easternmost end, with complex windows on the two main floors.

The building's footprint is 14,900 square feet (1,380 m^{2}). According to scale drawings, the irregularly shaped building is approximately 230 by 115 feet (70 m × 35 m) at its longest and widest points. Of that length, approximately the easternmost 75 feet (23 m) is the 1969 addition.

== Interior ==
Instead of a grand entrance at the front of the building leading straight into the sanctuary, entry into First Unitarian is by way of a doorway at the side of the building that requires a right turn past other spaces to reach the sanctuary. The sanctuary is entered beneath the low ceiling of the cantilevered choir loft, creating a sequence from shadow into light.

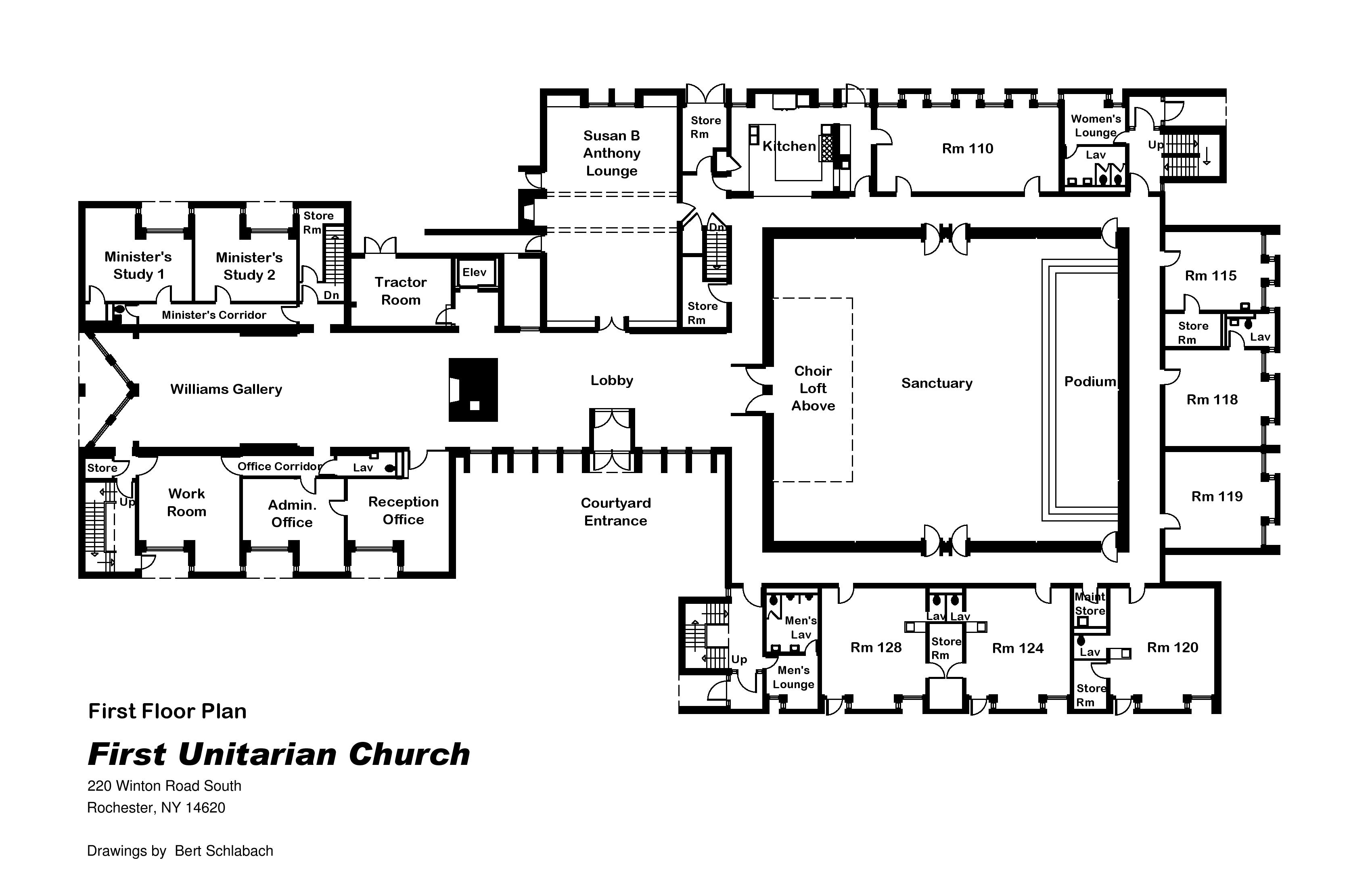
First floor plan. The 1969 addition begins at the left edge of the lobby. The north side of the building is at the bottom. The street is to the right.

"Civilization is measured by the shape of your ceiling," said Kahn. The complex ceiling of the sanctuary rises above both floors of surrounding rooms and extends over the sanctuary wall to the outer walls of the corridor outside. Light towers in the four corners of the sanctuary bring in indirect natural light from areas that are not typically well lit. The ceiling's layered outer edges and light-filled corners give the room "an expansive, boundless character", according to Kahn biographer Robert McCarter. Kahn said, "If you think about it, you realize that you don't say the same thing in a small room as you do in a large room."

Between the light towers is a cruciform concrete roof structure with a shape something like the underside of a ship's hull. Its outer edges do not sit directly on the sanctuary walls but rise above them, relieving what could be a perception of oppressive weightiness, according to Carter Wiseman, one of Kahn's biographers.

The massive ceiling structure is partly supported by twelve slender columns embedded in the sanctuary walls, three columns per wall. Square brackets on top of the central column in each wall support the lower folds of the slab. The brackets are split in the middle to allow the fold to be perceived as passing through to the outer corridor walls, which provide much of the ceiling support. Each central column is braced to the columns on either side by horizontal beams. The ceiling is lowest and darkest in the center, the opposite of classic church domes that are highest and brightest in the center. The cruciform shape that Kahn used for the ceiling is one that he had used in previous works, notably the Jewish Community Center of Trenton, New Jersey.

The tapestries on the sanctuary walls were designed by Kahn and, like the building itself, contain no literal symbolism. They were woven by Jack Lenor Larsen. At Kahn's request, the panels span the full color spectrum and yet were constructed entirely from one red, one blue, and one yellow yarn, with the remaining shades created with blends of those three yarns. The panels were designed not only for visual effect but also to correct a problem of sound reverberating from the concrete walls.

The primary building materials of the interior are concrete block, poured concrete and wood. Kahn left the natural surfaces of these materials exposed rather than applying an additional finish. This was Kahn's first extensive use of concrete and wood together, a combination he used in most of his later projects.

The sanctuary walls are 2 feet (0.61 m) thick and are built of concrete blocks. Hollow spaces within the walls function as ventilation ducts. The roof support columns embedded in the sanctuary walls are made of poured concrete, as is the roof and the outer walls of the corridor around the sanctuary. Left visible are patterns made by the thin strips of wood that composed the forms into which the concrete was poured. Kahn procured unusually long strips of wood to construct the forms for the sanctuary ceiling. As he had done earlier with the main stairwell in the Yale University Art Gallery, Kahn also left visible the pattern of circular holes created by the devices that held the forms together while concrete was being poured for the walls, letting the marks of construction serve as the "basis for ornament".

Sherri Geldin, writing of Kahn in the prologue to Louis I. Kahn: In the Realm of Architecture, said: "He attached almost mythic significance to the 'meeting place,' to any setting where communal interaction occurs ... His religious buildings and projects ... aspire to evoke a state of grace that is without dogma or sectarian distinctions, underscoring instead that which is universal and transcendent."

During the initial design discussions, Kahn asked Komendant, "What is most important in a church?" and then answered that question himself by saying "the essence of atmosphere for a church is silence and light. Light and Silence!" Silence and Light later became the name of an essay that Kahn wrote in 1968 in which he explained concepts crucial to his philosophy. Robert Twombly, an editor of Kahn's writings, said that by silence, Kahn meant "the desire ... of every person to create, which for Kahn was the same thing as being alive ... To the silence of humanity's innate urge to create comes the sun's life-supporting power, giving to silence the ability to act." Architectural historian Vincent Scully said of the church, "You can really feel the silence he talked about, thrumming as with the presence of divinity, when the cinder block is washed silver by the light that floods down upon it, while the heavy, heavy slab is lifted overhead."

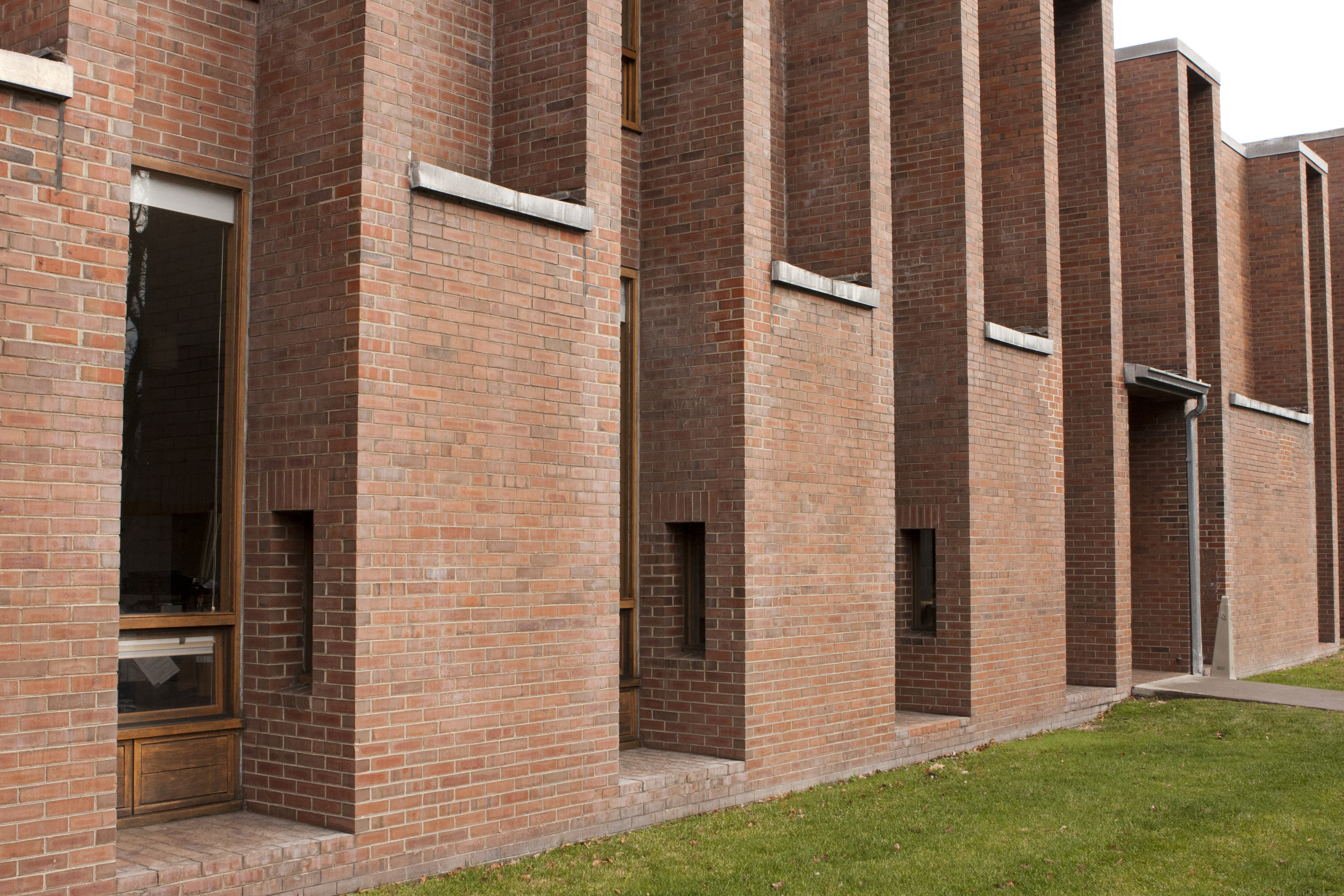
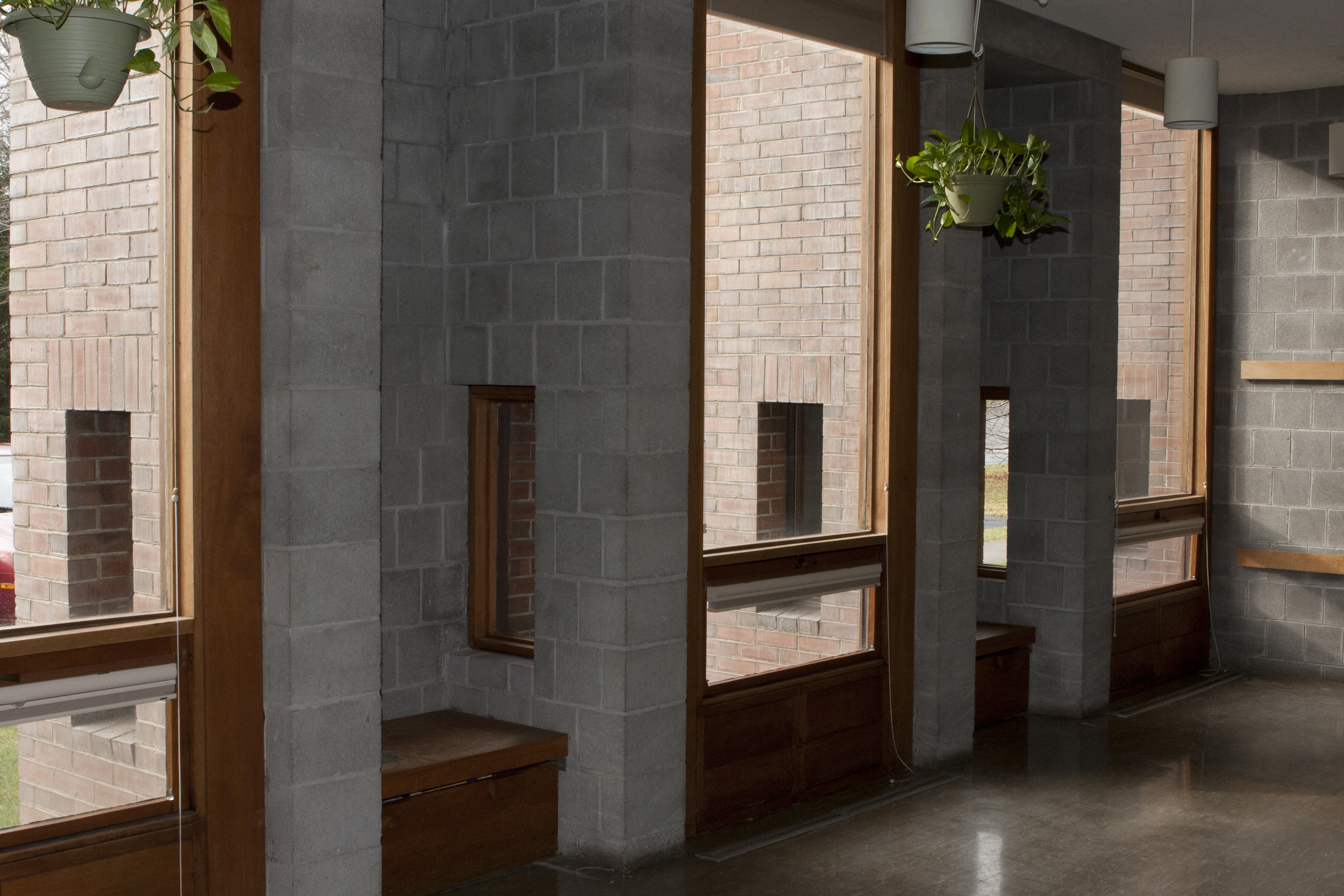
Exterior and interior views of the ground floor projections with bench seats

In the classrooms, bench seats with small side windows are placed in projections of the outer walls. These spaces create the impression of little rooms carved from the outer walls, and, according to Robert McCarter, they continue Kahn's architectural theme of the classrooms themselves appearing as rooms imbedded within thick, castle-like walls.

In the 1969 addition, the rectangular gallery on the first floor is designed so that it can be used either as an extension of the lobby or separated into smaller rooms by massive doors. Church offices are located on both sides of the gallery. The second floor has a loose arrangement of spaces that can be combined into a large room or used separately. The two main floors of the addition have fireplaces at the end nearest the sanctuary and large windows at the far end that reveal the natural world outside.

== Monumentality and authenticity ==
Sarah Williams Goldhagen, author of Louis Kahn's Situated Modernism, says that Kahn was troubled by the socially corrosive aspects of modern society. He believed, in her words, that "architecture must foster people's ethical formation. People who are anchored in their community, morally obligated and psychologically connected to the people surrounding them, make for better citizens." Because his social agenda was compatible with Unitarian ideals, he was in a good position to manifest his vision of community in architectural form at the Rochester church. According to Goldhagen, Kahn used two architectural approaches to situate his buildings' users both in society and in themselves. One is monumentality, which anchors people socially and promotes a feeling of community. The other is authenticity, which fosters self-awareness and promotes individual responsibility.

Kahn's first major essay as sole author, published in 1944, was called "Monumentality," a concept he defined as "a spiritual quality inherent in a structure which conveys the feeling of its eternity". Sonit Bafna says that in the early 1950s Kahn "had begun to develop a distinctive approach to architecture. An overriding concern for him from this period on was to instill a sense of permanence into his buildings, so that his work could match the dignity and poise of the ruins he had seen in Italy and southern Europe." Goldhagen says that Kahn used monumentality to strengthen the sense of community among those who used his buildings: the massiveness of a Kahn building instills the feeling that both the building and the institution it houses will last for a very long time. At First Unitarian, says Goldhagen, the column-like rhythms of light that Kahn sculpted across the facade are among the devices that increase the impression of massiveness and give the building an air of monumentality.

Secondly, according to Goldhagen, Kahn strove for "an architecture of authenticity." Authenticity is a concept popularized by the existentialist writer Jean-Paul Sartre, who, in Goldhagen's words, believed that "To live authentically, one has to strive for a heightened awareness not only of oneself but also of one's place in a specific historical moment and place. This requires acute perception of one's social and physical environment, which is difficult because a person tends to apprehend the objects and buildings that surround her as instruments". Authenticity encourages people to focus "not on the instrumentality of the everyday world but rather on an object's shape, texture, and materiality." In contrast to other modern architects like Mies van der Rohe, Kahn shunned "the diaphanous and the transparent so that he could press the viewer up against materiality, substance and weight." Goldhagen notes that "It is all but impossible to enter one of Kahn's buildings and not to notice it, not to inspect it or look intently at it." Kahn strove for an aesthetic of authenticity at First Unitarian, says Goldhagen, by designing with a blunt honesty of materials and by laying bare the process of construction. Kahn said, "I believe in frank architecture. A building is a struggle, not a miracle, and the architect should acknowledge this."

Kahn had partially achieved these two aspirations in earlier works, according to Goldhagen. The Yale University Art Gallery, for example, with its emphasis on process over finish, promotes authenticity, situating people in themselves, while the Richards Medical Research Laboratories were designed to reinforce group cooperation. Goldhagen says that it was with First Unitarian that Kahn first succeeded in situating his building's users both in themselves and in society, an agenda that he was later able to develop more fully at the Salk Institute and National Assembly Complex in Dhaka, Bangladesh, which had much larger budgets.

== Importance to Kahn's career ==
According to Goldhagen, the First Unitarian Church of Rochester was "the first building Kahn built that gave an indication of his mature style". Vincent Scully, in his Modern Architecture and Other Essays, similarly says "the experience of designing the church at Rochester seems to have brought Kahn to a confident maturity and confirmed him in his method of design."

Kahn worked primarily for institutions that advanced the public good, including schools, museums, research institutes, government bodies, and religious organizations. Goldhagen says that at First Unitarian Kahn developed a philosophy for creating architecture for such organizations: "Kahn's philosophy of the 'architecture of institutions,' developed while designing the First Unitarian Church in Rochester, stipulated that the architect's first and highest duty was to develop an idealized vision of an institution's 'way of life' and then to give that vision form—or, as he would have put it, Form."

Robin B. Williams, writing in Louis I. Kahn: In the Realm of Architecture, says the design approach that Kahn followed at First Unitarian, particularly the introduction of his Form drawing, was important to the development of his process for transforming an intangible architectural idea into an actual building:

Kahn made his enthusiasm for the First Unitarian Church evident even before it received final approval from the building committee. As early as October 1960, in a lecture in California, he had chosen it to illustrate a pair of terms—"form" and "design"—that were becoming key tenets of his philosophy. He used these words to describe his conception of architecture—and in particular his design procedure—as the translation of the intangible into the real. It was at this time that Kahn mythologized the way the design of the church had evolved, composing an account (accompanied by the now-famous diagram) that, since its publication in April 1961, has been seen as the clearest illustration of his design approach.

Kahn worked on this lecture for several months and published it as an essay called Form and Design. A colleague described it as the best embodiment of his ideas at that time and said that when people requested examples of Kahn's publications, he most often sent this essay.

== Recognition ==
- Paul Goldberger, Pulitzer-Prize-winning architectural critic for The New York Times, described the First Unitarian Church of Rochester in 1982 as one of "the greatest religious structures of this century" along with Notre Dame du Haut in Ronchamp, France, by Le Corbusier; Unity Temple in Oak Park, Illinois, by Frank Lloyd Wright; and the Christian Science Church in Berkeley, California, by Bernard Maybeck.
- The First Unitarian Church of Rochester is used as a case study in Artist's Work/Artist's Voice: Louis I. Kahn, an educator's guide developed by the Museum of Modern Art to introduce students to architecture.
- The First Unitarian Church of Rochester was officially listed on the National Register of Historic Places on September 2, 2014.

== See also ==
- National Register of Historic Places listings in Rochester, New York
