= Olivetti-Underwood Factory =

Building by Louis Kahn in Pennsylvania

- Interactive map of the Olivetti-Underwood Factory area

General information
- Location: 2800 Valley Road, Harrisburg, Pennsylvania, United States of America
- Coordinates: 40.3060°N 76.8392°W
- Construction started: 1966
- Completed: 1970

Technical details
- Structural system: prestressed concrete units
- Material: concrete

Design and construction
- Architect: Louis Kahn
- Structural engineer: Keast and Hood, Dr. August Komendant
- Other designers: Renzo Piano

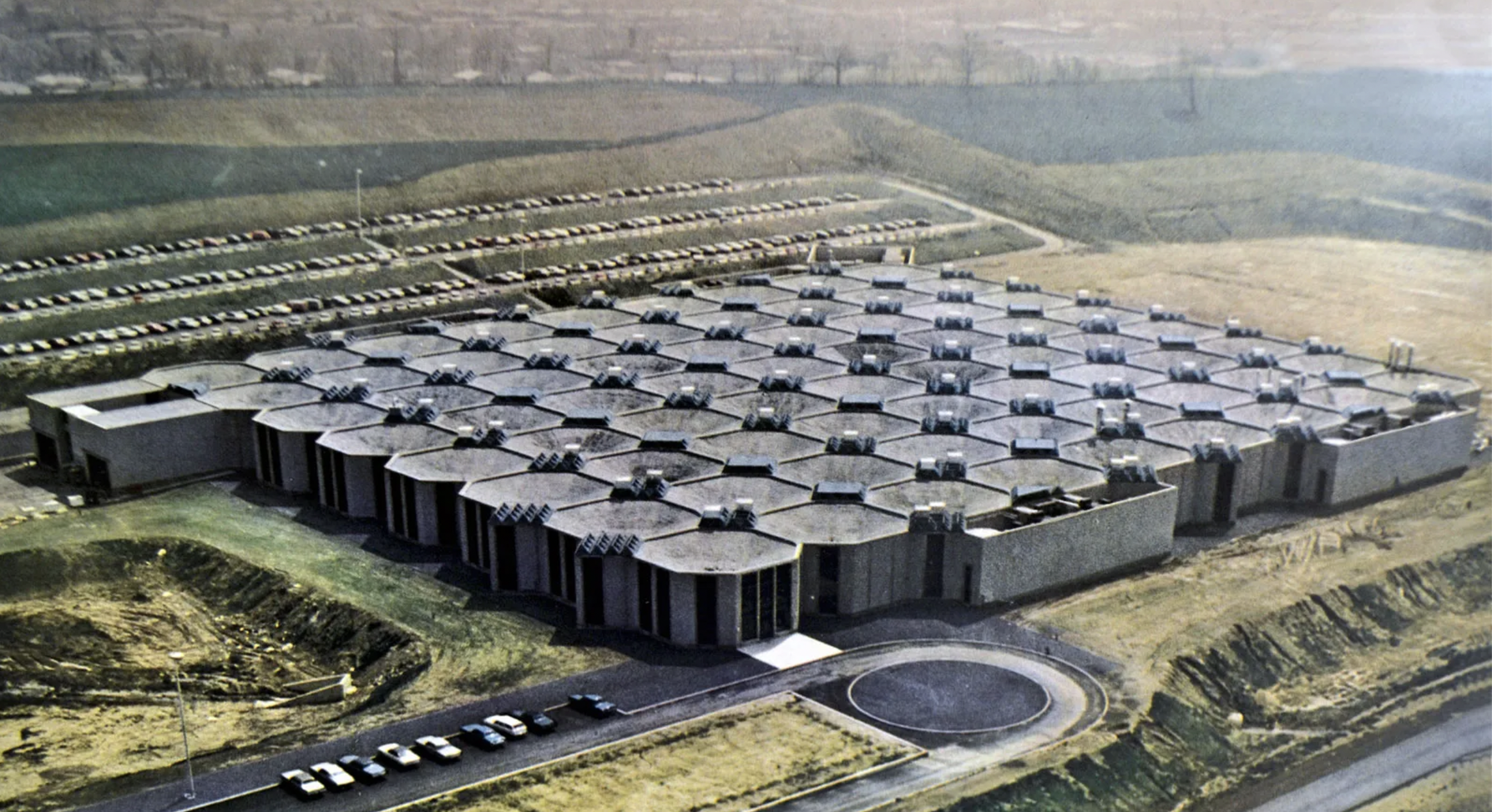

The Olivetti-Underwood Factory was designed by architect Louis Kahn. Olivetti, an Italian company, commissioned Kahn in 1966 to design the Harrisburg, Pennsylvania building for the manufacture of their Underwood line of typewriters and related products. It was completed in 1970.

Joseph Rykwert, an architectural historian and critic, said that corporations don't usually hire famous architects to design their factory buildings, and those architects probably wouldn't be interested anyway because of the limited creative possibilities. Olivetti, however, "were then the most discerning patrons of industrial building - anywhere," according to Rykwert, and Kahn was happy to work for a client as sophisticated as Olivetti.

The key design limitation was that the factory floor needed to be as open as possible to enable rapid reconfiguration of equipment to meet changing market requirements. The easy way to meet this limitation would have been to build the factory as a steel frame structure, but Kahn didn't build any structures of that type after 1950, preferring the more monumental appearance he could achieve with materials like concrete and brick. Kahn, relying on the expertise of August Komendant, a structural engineer and Kahn's preferred collaborator, instead designed the building as a concrete structure. Komendant was an authority on techniques for greatly increasing the strength of concrete by prestressing it, making it possible to build structures that are more graceful than would be possible with ordinary concrete.

The Olivetti-Underwood Factory consists of 72 prestressed concrete units locked together in an 8x9 grid. Each unit looks something like a square dish with clipped corners perched on top of a relatively thin concrete column. The dish is a prismatic concrete shell 6 inches (15 cm) thick, 30 feet (9 m) above the factory floor and 60 feet (18 m) across, covering 3600 square feet (334 m²) of roof. Rain water drains from the roof down a pipe in the center of the column. Because the outer four corners of each unit are clipped, a void is left at the place where four units meet that allows natural light to reach the factory floor through a translucent skylight.

Kahn had been interested in structures of this type for some time, having designed a prototype Parasol House in 1944 for use as prefabricated housing in the post-war years. Never built, it featured a flat roof supported by a slender column and was designed to be used either as a stand-alone housing unit or in combination with other units to form a linear structure. A precedent was the "Great Workroom" in the Johnson Wax Headquarters, which was designed by Frank Lloyd Wright and completed in 1939.

Renzo Piano, a young Italian architect with an established practice in Genoa, used his connections with the Olivetti company to gain the equivalent of an internship with Kahn for several months while the factory was being designed, working primarily on the roofing system. Piano went on to become a noted architect himself and in 2007 was chosen to design an additional building for the Kimbell Art Museum, one of Louis Kahn's masterpieces.
