= Fakhraddin Najafov =

National Hero of Azerbaijan

- Fəxrəddin Nəcəfov
- Born: 3 March 1967; Baku, Azerbaijan SSR
- Died: 4 September 1992 (aged 25); Çıldıran, Aghdara District, Azerbaijan
- Military career
- Allegiance: Azerbaijan
- Branch: Azerbaijani Armed Forces
- Service years: 1991-1992
- Conflicts: First Nagorno-Karabakh War
- Awards: National Hero of Azerbaijan; 1992

Fakhraddin Valiyaddin oglu Najafov (Azerbaijani: Fəxrəddin Nəcəfov) (31 March 1967, Baku, Azerbaijan SSR - 4 September 1992, Çıldıran, Aghdara District, Azerbaijan) was a National Hero of Azerbaijan and warrior during the First Nagorno-Karabakh War.

== Early life and education ==
Najafov was born on 31 March 1967 in Baku, Azerbaijan SSR. In 1984, he completed his secondary education at the Secondary School No. 19 in Baku. From 1985 through 1987, Najafov served in the Soviet Armed Forces.

== First Nagorno-Karabakh war ==
When Armenians attacked the territories of Azerbaijan, he voluntarily went to the front-line. In 1992, Najafov was appointed the commander of one of the military units in Agdam. On 4 September 1992 he was killed in a heavy battle around the village of Chyldyran of Aghdara Rayon of Azerbaijan.

== Honors ==
Anvar Talish oglu Arazov was posthumously awarded the title "National Hero of Azerbaijan" by Presidential Decree dated 6 November 1992.

He was buried at a Martyrs' Lane cemetery in Baku. The secondary school No. 266 in Baku is named after him.

== See also ==
- First Nagorno-Karabakh War
- List of National Heroes of Azerbaijan

== Sources ==
- Vugar Asgarov. Azərbaycanın Milli Qəhrəmanları (Yenidən işlənmiş II nəşr). Bakı: "Dərələyəz-M", 2010, səh. 224.
