= August Komendant =

American and Estonian structural engineer

August Eduard Komendant (October 2, 1906 – September 14, 1992) was an Estonian and American structural engineer and a pioneer in the field of prestressed concrete, which can be used to build stronger and more graceful structures than normal concrete. He was born in Estonia and educated in engineering in Germany. After World War II he immigrated to the United States, where he wrote several books on structural engineering and served as a professor of architecture at the University of Pennsylvania.

Komendant worked with architect Louis Kahn in a productive but contentious collaboration that lasted from 1956 until Kahn's death in 1974. His innovative work as Kahn's structural engineer helped Kahn create several architecturally significant buildings, including two that won the prestigious Twenty-five Year Award given by the American Institute of Architects. He also served as structural engineer for architect Moshe Safdie on the Habitat 67 project in Montreal, Quebec, Canada.

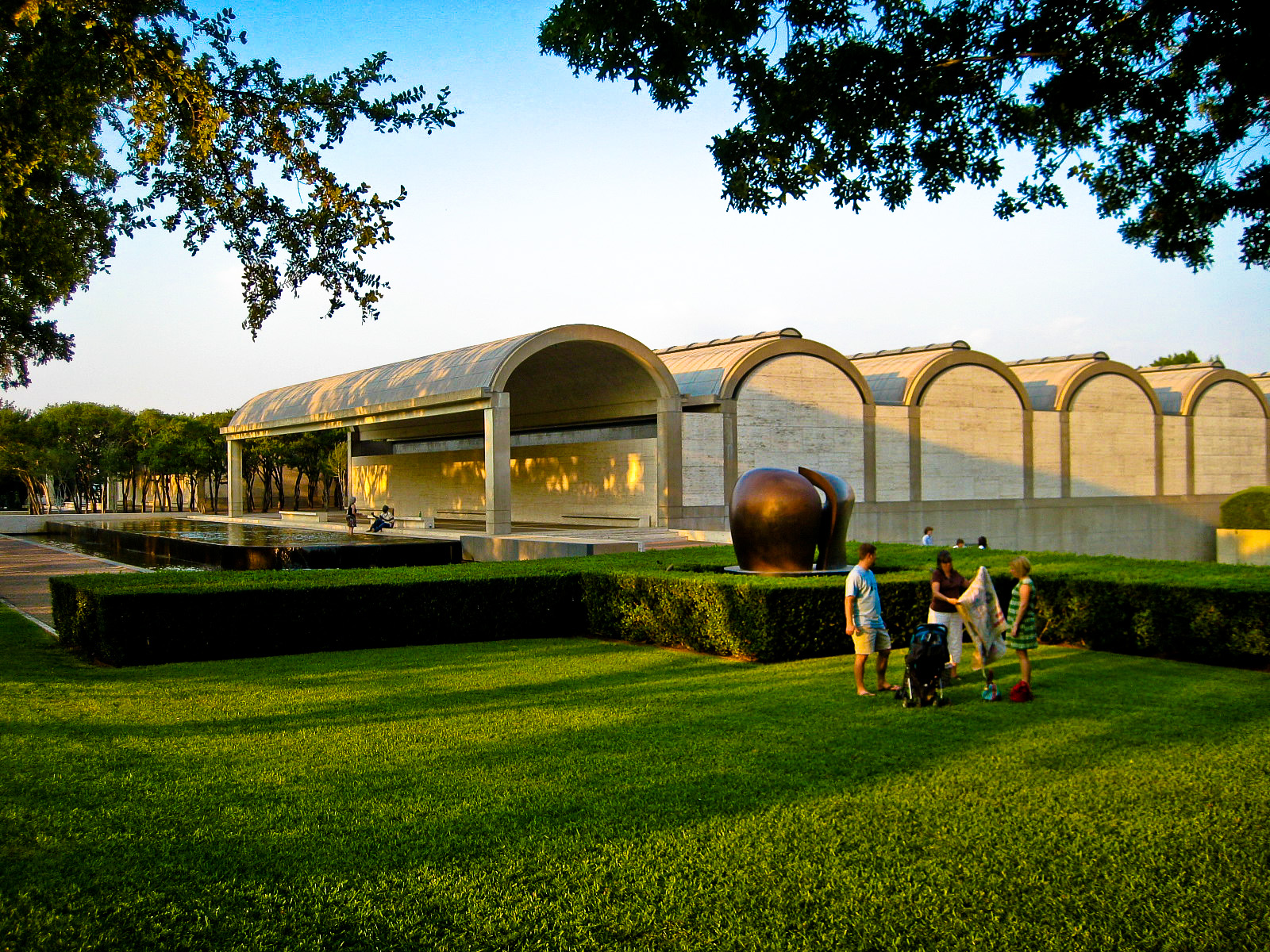
At the Kimbell Art Museum, one of Louis Kahn's masterpieces, Komendant engineered long, vaulted gallery roofs that require support only at their four corners, minimizing obstruction within the museum.

== Life ==
August E. Komendant was born in 1906 in Mäo Parish, Estonia. After his studies in engineering at the Technical Institute in Dresden, Germany, he returned to Estonia where he was responsible for several major bridges and other structures.

After Germany overran Estonia during World War II, Komendant was shipped back to Germany to work on war projects. He was interned by the U.S. Army in the latter stages of the war and was recruited by General George Patton to work for him. According to Komendant, when Patton ordered him to inspect a damaged bridge to see if it would support the weight of his tanks, Komendant used a brush and white paint to mark a wavy route across the bridge that tanks could safely follow and then rode across the bridge with Patton. After the war he was assigned to work for the U.S. Army rebuilding war-damaged bridges.

In 1950, Komendant immigrated to the U.S. and set up a consulting practice in Upper Montclair, New Jersey. In 1952, based on his experience with developing techniques for using pre-stressed concrete to rebuild war-damaged bridges, he published Prestressed Concrete Structures, a book that established him as an authority on the subject. Komendant was fond of explaining how pre-stressed concrete works by demonstrating that one can lift a row of books by squeezing them together so tightly that they act as a single strong unit. Similarly, steel cables or bars under high tension can be used to "squeeze" concrete, making it much stronger than it otherwise would be. This type of concrete can be used to build structures that are lighter, more graceful, and in a much greater variety of shapes than standard concrete.

Komendant was Professor of Architecture at the University of Pennsylvania from 1959 to 1974 and visiting professor at the Pratt Institute in the late 1970s.

== Collaboration with Louis Kahn ==
In 1956 Komendant met architect Louis Kahn, who was soon to become one of the most honored architects of his time, and began a contentious but highly productive collaboration that lasted until Kahn's death 18 years later. Kahn was five years older than Komendant and, like him, had been born in Estonia.

Kahn had decided in the early 1950s that he would no longer use the relatively lightweight steel structures that were typical of modern architecture. He had come to the conclusion that only structures made of reinforced concrete would allow him to achieve his goal of creating structures that would simultaneously provide support, shape spaces and furnish integral sculptural embellishment. This approach required the collaboration of a structural engineer who understood Kahn's architectural philosophy, one who could grasp the effect Kahn wanted to produce with a proposed design and suggest a suitable alternative if it was not practical from an engineering standpoint. Komendant, who was already known for his expertise with pre-stressed concrete, proved to be a creative thinker and a productive collaborator. Kahn described him as "'one of the rare engineers qualified to guide the architect to develop meaningful form". According to Robert McCarter, one of Kahn's biographers, "Komendant would serve as Kahn's primary consultant on the majority of his commissions for the rest of his career".

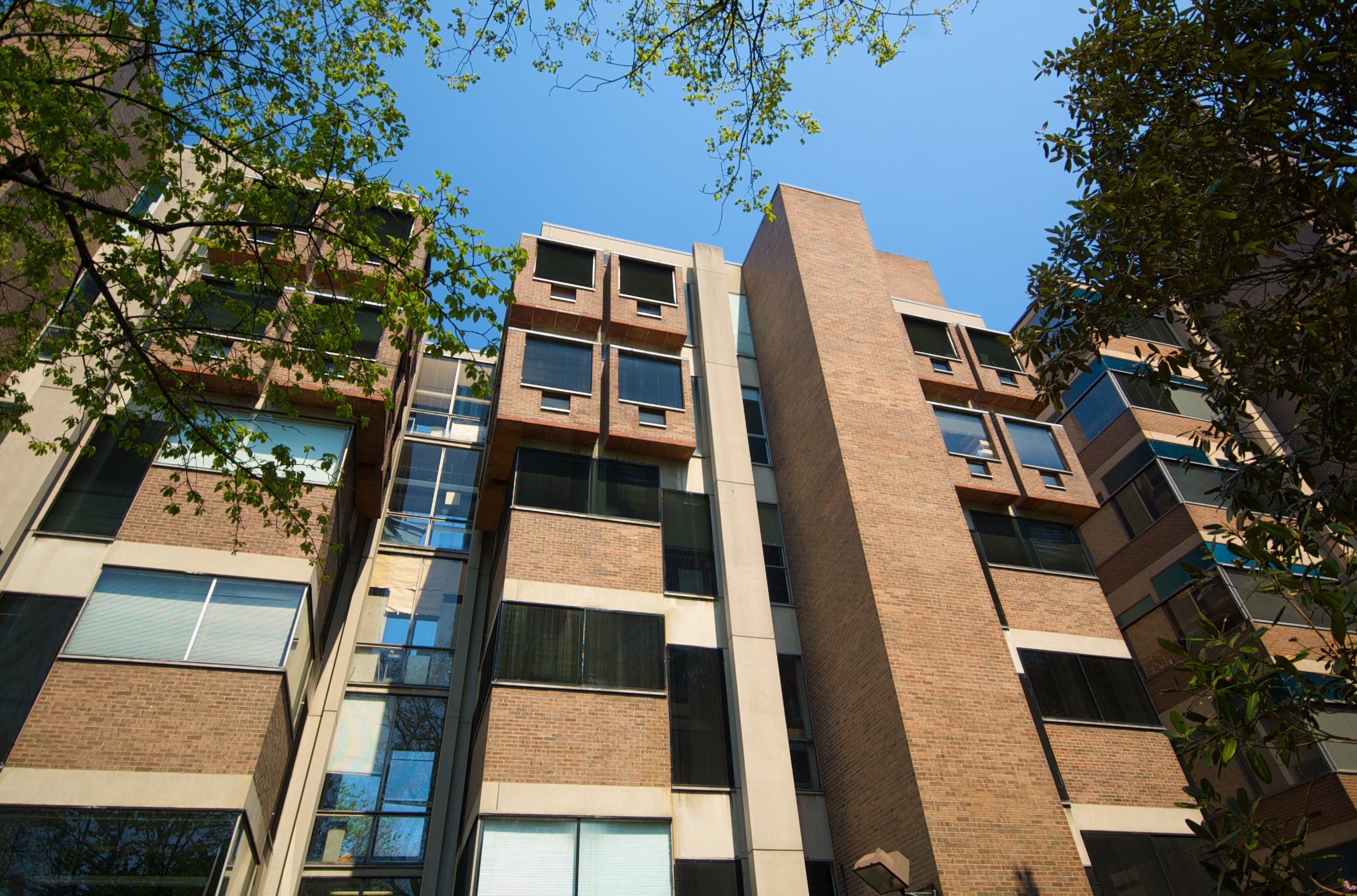
Richards Medical Research Laboratories. The concrete structural elements that Komendant engineered appear in beige color here.

The first project they worked on together, the Richards Medical Research Laboratories, was a breakthrough project for Kahn, his first to receive widespread recognition. Two other buildings they worked on together, the Salk Institute for Biological Studies and the Kimbell Art Museum, received the prestigious Twenty-five Year Award, which is given by the American Institute of Architects to only one building per year.

Although each of them knew they achieved particularly outstanding results when they worked together, they did not always find it easy to do so. Komendant could work with exceptional speed while Kahn was notoriously slow, to Komendant's great frustration. Komendant felt free to critique Kahn's designs not only as an engineer but also in architectural terms. That could make Kahn feel that his role as architect was being questioned, whereupon Kahn would pointedly remind Komendant that he was an engineer, not an architect. Komendant in turn delighted in needling Kahn about his lack of engineering knowledge. More ominously for their relationship, Komendant "was not above expanding on his share of the credit for shared projects", and Kahn found it difficult to share credit with anyone, two factors that led Komendant to boycott the opening ceremonies for the Kimbell Art Museum, one of Kahn's greatest works and one to which Komendant had contributed significantly.

In the early 1960s they collaborated on the National Assembly Building in Dhaka, Bangladesh during its initial design phases, but Komendant walked off the job after a sharp disagreement with Kahn, and they were personally distant for about three years afterwards. During this period, however, they continued to collaborate on the Salk Institute and as members of the architectural faculty at the University of Pennsylvania.

Despite their sometimes stormy relationship, they took great pride in the results of their work together. Thomas Leslie, author of Louis I. Kahn: Building Art, Building Science, said, "From his writings, it is painfully obvious that Komendant deeply loved the work he did with Kahn, and that these buildings were, without question, his most widely recognized and honored projects." Kahn acknowledged his debt to Komendant in a handwritten note reproduced in the introduction to Komendant's book 18 years with Architect Louis I. Kahn: "To August whose genius has made my buildings his buildings and are the very ones that have wonder about them."

Thomas Leslie described their relationship in these words: "Komendant was neither a form-giver nor a designer, limitations that he reluctantly admitted. Kahn, on the other hand, despite his exquisite attention to detail, did not possess the mathematically analytical mind that had won Komendant acclaim. Each needed the other's sensibility, and their results of their collaborations would be flawlessly integrated meshes of structure and architecture, inconceivable without their stormy partnership's long arguments and impassioned debates about space and structure."

=== Richards Medical Research Laboratories ===
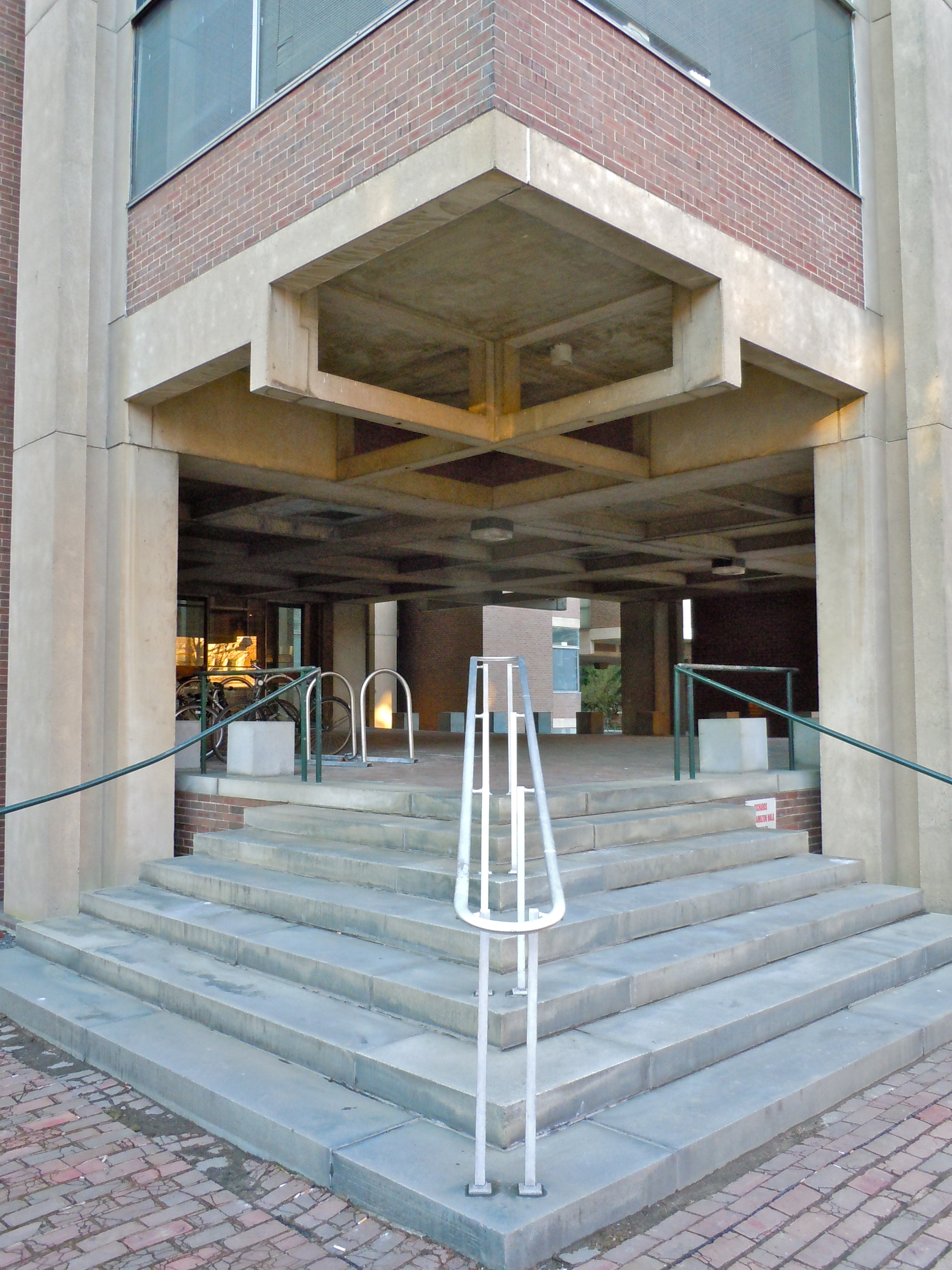
Entry porch at Richards Medical Research Laboratories. The ceiling exposes concrete structural elements that are bound together with internal cables to form Vierendeel trusses.

For the eight-story Richards Medical Research Laboratories (1957–1965) in Philadelphia, PA, Komendant engineered the structure of pre-cast and pre-stressed concrete columns, beams and trusses that were trucked in from a factory and fitted together with a crane. Hydraulic tension was then applied to internal post-tensioning cables running in all three dimensions, locking the structural elements into place something like a child's toy that is floppy until its parts are pulled together tightly with a string. There were a total of 1019 of these structural elements, and for the post-tensioning to be effective, they had to be precisely dimensioned and perfectly formed. Komendant worked closely with the manufacturer to ensure that outcome, with the result that the largest offset between any two elements in the finished structure was only 1/16 inch (1.6 mm).

In line with his belief that structure should be made visible, Kahn exposed these structural elements on the building's exterior and in the laboratory ceilings. He also left the ceiling of the entry porch open so the public could inspect the structure there, including the Vierendeel trusses that Komendant engineered to support each floor. Looking something like ladders turned on their sides, these trusses have large, rectangular openings that make it easy to thread pipes and ductwork into the laboratories.

Despite significant shortcomings from the viewpoint of the scientists who worked there, the building won international acclaim not only for its architecture but also for its innovative building techniques. In 1961 the Museum of Modern Art sponsored an exhibition devoted exclusively to this building, describing it in a brochure as "probably the single most consequential building constructed in the United States since the war". Architectural historian Vincent Scully said the pioneering work by Kahn and Komendant on this project "was to affect for good the techniques of the whole concrete pre-casting industry from the factory to the site." The Architectural Record noted at the time that the precision achieved was "more typical of fine cabinetwork than of concrete construction."

=== Salk Institute for Biological Studies ===
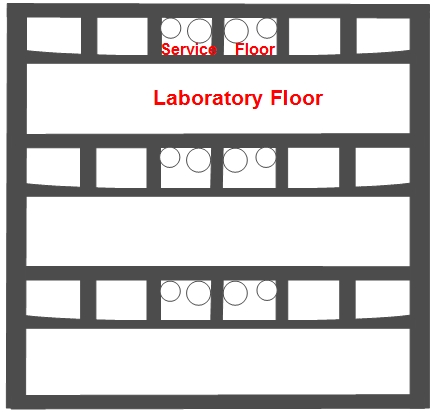
A section of a laboratory building at the Salk Institute. Above each laboratory floor is a service floor to handle air ducts, piping, etc. The ladder-like structures that encase the service floors are Vierendeel trusses.

At the Salk Institute for Biological Studies (1959–1965) in La Jolla, CA, the need for mechanical services (air ducts, pipes, etc.) was so extensive that Kahn decided to create a separate service floor for them above each laboratory floor to make it easier to reconfigure individual laboratories in the future without disrupting neighboring spaces. He also designed each laboratory floor to be entirely free of internal support columns, making laboratory configuration easier. Komendant engineered the Vierendeel trusses that make this arrangement possible. These pre-stressed concrete trusses are about 62 feet (19 m) long, spanning the full width of each floor and extending from the bottom of each service floor to the top. They are supported by steel cables embedded in the concrete in a curve similar to that of cables supporting a suspension bridge. Their rectangular openings, which are 6 feet (1.8 m) high in the center and 5 feet (1.5 m) at the ends, allow maintenance workers to move easily through the thicket of pipes and ducts on the service floors. The trusses impose strictly vertical loads on their support columns, to which they are attached not rigidly but with a system of slip plates and tension cables to permit small movements during moderate earthquakes.

After two years of design work, and even after the design had been approved and meetings with potential building contractors had begun, Kahn and the Salk Institute abruptly decided to reduce the number of laboratory buildings from four narrow ones to two wider ones and to increase the number of floors per building from two to three. Komendant re-engineered the structure and produced a new set of drawings with a speed that professor Leslie described as "legendary". He also trained the construction workers in techniques for producing a highly refined concrete finish.

In 1992 the American Institute of Architects (AIA) gave this building its prestigious Twenty-five Year Award, which is given to only one building per year.

=== First Unitarian Church of Rochester ===
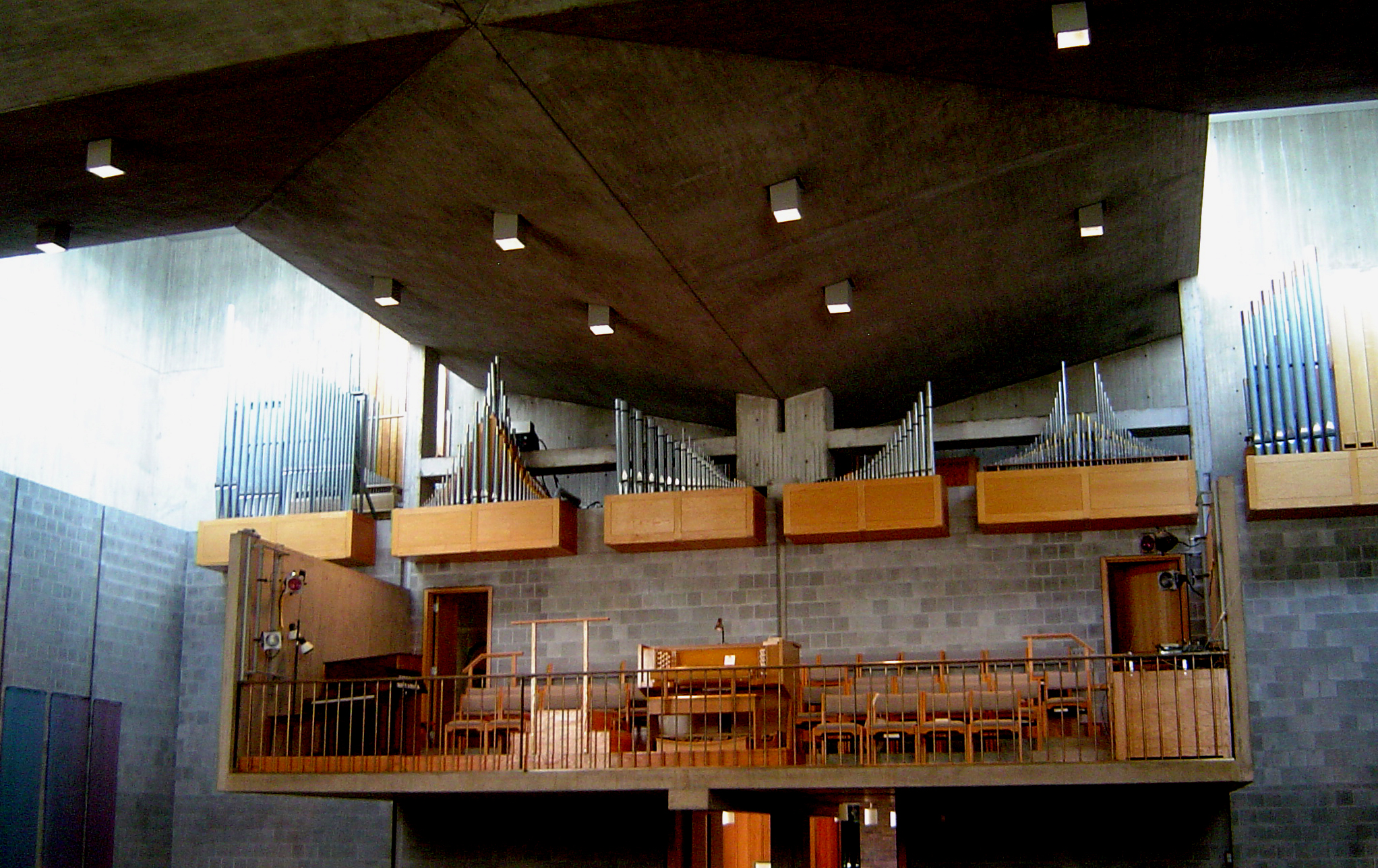
Roof structure above the choir loft at the First Unitarian Church of Rochester

At the First Unitarian Church (1959–1969) in Rochester, NY, Kahn faced the challenge of placing a heavy concrete roof structure between four light towers in the corners of the sanctuary without using support columns in the interior of the room. Not entirely satisfied with the roof design he had developed, Kahn asked Komendant for suggestions. Komendant kept Kahn's general layout of the roof but redesigned it as a folded-plate structure of pre-stressed concrete that would require support only at its edges, eliminating the need for the massive concrete beams that Kahn had been planning to use as its support. Kahn adopted Komendant's design, although with modifications.

The contractor in charge of construction had no experience with this type of roof structure, so Komendant agreed to inspect the forms before concrete was poured and return after the concrete had cured to supervise the hydraulic tensioning of internal support cables. The contractor feared that the heavy roof structure would collapse when the forms were removed, but Komendant assured him that it would settle no more than 1/4 inch (6.4 mm). It actually settled less than 1/8 inch (3.2 mm).

Paul Goldberger, architectural critic for The New York Times and winner of the Pulitzer Prize for Criticism, described this building in 1982 as one of the "greatest religious structures of this century".

=== Olivetti-Underwood Factory ===
For the Olivetti-Underwood Factory (1966–1970) in Harrisburg, PA, the Olivetti company, a firm noted for its commitment to good design, hired Louis Kahn to design its factory building. Komendant engineered the building's structure, which consists of 72 prestressed concrete units locked together in an 8x9 grid to form the building's roof and roof support system. Each of these units is a prismatic concrete shell that looks something like a square dish with clipped corners perched on top of a relatively thin concrete column. Each shell is 30 feet (9.1 m) above the factory floor and 60 feet (18 m) across, covering 3,600 square feet (330 m^{2}) of roof.

=== Kimbell Art Museum ===
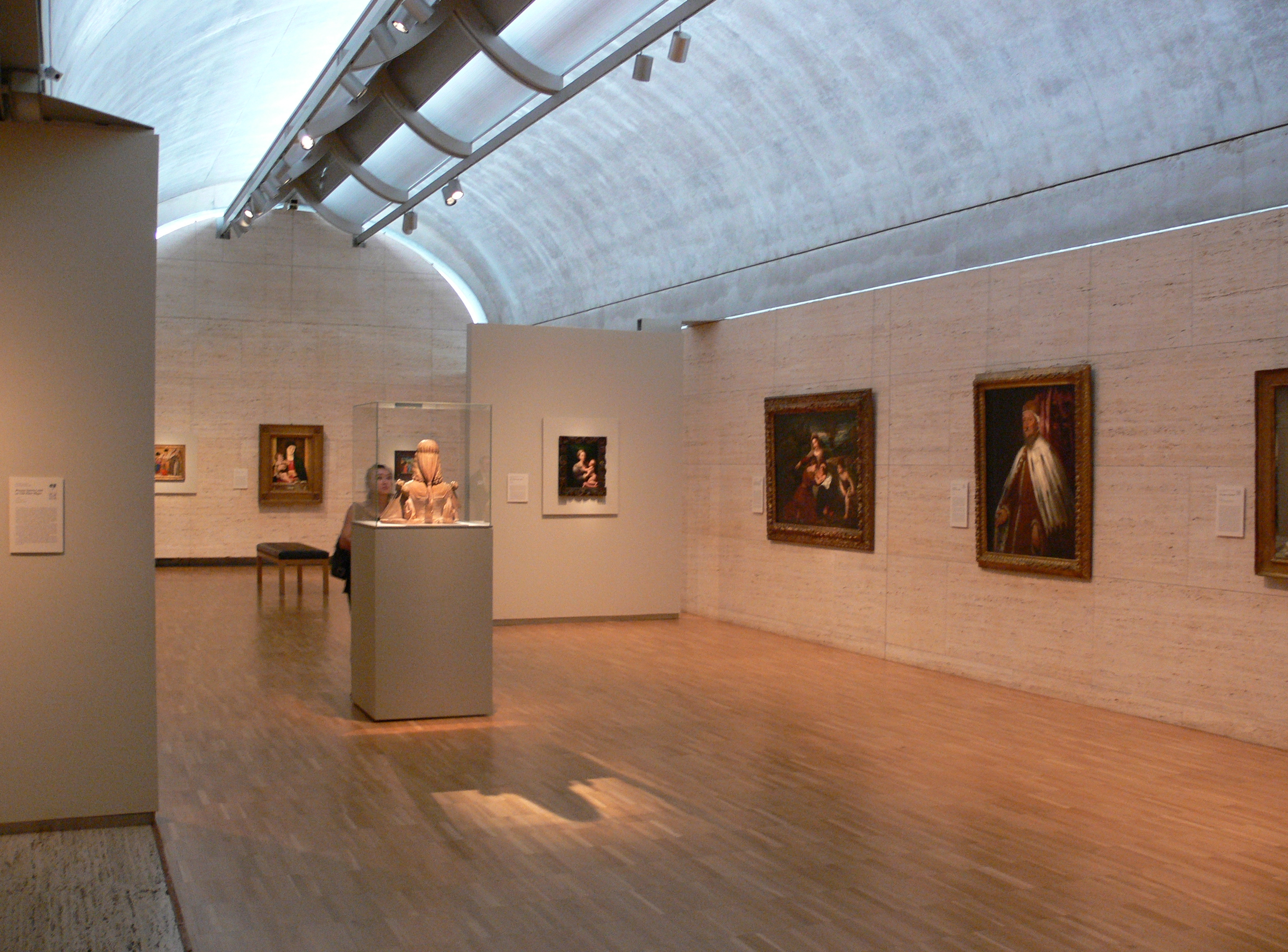
Gallery with curved roof shell at the Kimbell Art Museum. Outside light appearing through thin strips of glass at the ends and along the length of the shell demonstrate that it is supported only at its four corners.

At the Kimbell Art Museum (1966–1972) in Fort Worth, TX, Komendant played a key role in designing curved concrete gallery roof shells that do not require interior support, thereby minimizing obstruction on the gallery floors. Before Komendant's arrival on the project, Kahn had been designing the curved gallery roofs as vaults supported by a series of columns along their edges. Komendant recognized that the gallery roofs should be engineered not as true vaults but as vault-shaped beams that would require support only at their four corners. These beams are supported by cables something like those that support a suspension bridge, except these cables run through tubes embedded in the curved concrete shells. After the concrete had set, hydraulic force was used to place the hidden cables in a state of permanent tension. The result, according to professor Steven Fleming, was "post-tensioned curved concrete beams, spanning an incredible 100 feet" (30.5 m), which "happened to have been the maximum distance that concrete walls or vaults could be produced without requiring expansion control joints."

As he had done at the Salk Institute, Komendant personally trained the construction workers in techniques of concrete finishing. According to professor Leslie, Komendant "almost single-handedly assured the resulting concrete finishes, by far the best on a Kahn building and some of the finest in the world."

Komendant played a significant role in handling a conflict between Kahn and the local engineering firm that had been given major responsibility for the museum's design and construction. Among other things, the engineering firm thought the proposed curved gallery roofs were structurally unsound and proposed a flat roof instead. The disagreement developed into a crisis that threatened the entire project, which was already over budget and behind schedule. To resolve the dispute, Komendant was given complete control over the final design and construction drawings. According to professor Leslie, Komendant "was demonstrably the major influence in Kahn being kept on the job, and in the project being done at all."

Robert Campbell, architectural critic for the Boston Globe and winner of the Pulitzer Prize for Criticism, declared the Kimbell Art Museum to be "the greatest American building of the second half of the 20th century". In 1998 the AIA gave this building its Twenty-five Year Award.

== Other major work ==
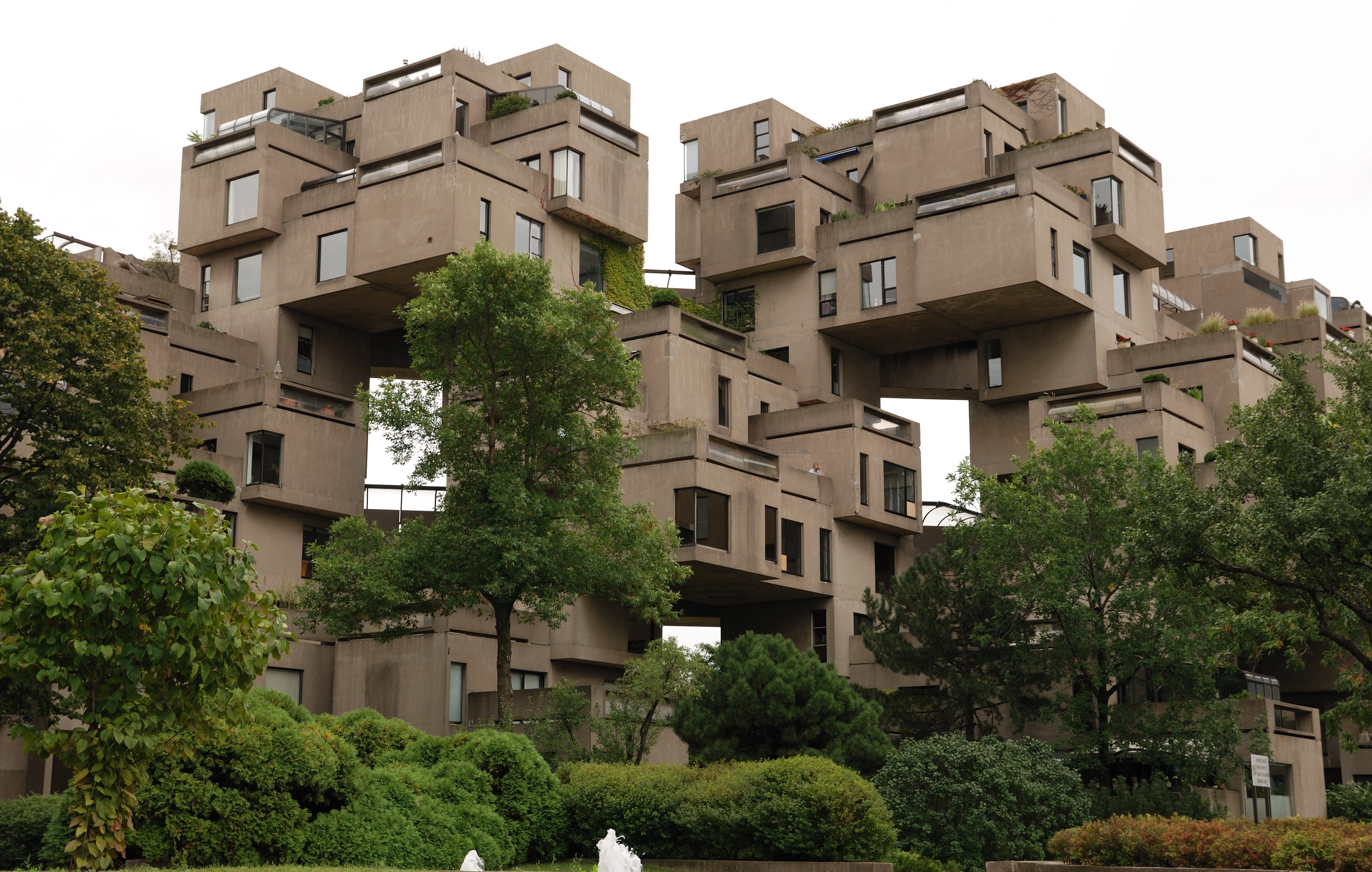
A portion of Habitat 67

From 1964 to 1967, during the period when he and Kahn were personally distant, Komendant worked with architect Moshe Safdie on the Habitat 67 project in Montreal, Quebec, Canada. Safdie had received the commission to build a housing complex for Montreal's Expo 67 on the basis of his university thesis project although he was only 25 years old and had never built anything before. Safdie and Komendant had met earlier while Safdie was working in Kahn's office as an apprentice. At Safdie's request, Komendant agreed to be the structural engineer for the project, for which he designed the prefabrication systems. Called Habitat 67, the complex originally consisted of 354 prefabricated concrete containers of identical size that were assembled with a crane and locked together to create 158 apartments in 19 different sizes and configurations. The complex is about four blocks long and as much as eleven levels above the ground. Each apartment has a private terrace and garden area. The apartment complex has become one of the most coveted addresses in Montreal, attracting cultural and political leaders.

== Publications and awards ==
Komendant was the author of several books, including:

- Prestressed Concrete Structures, 1952
- Contemporary Concrete Structures, 1972
- 18 years with Architect Louis I. Kahn, 1975
- Practical Structural Analysis for Architectural Engineering, 1987

In his book 18 years with Architect Louis I. Kahn, Komendant reproduced a letter that Kahn had written to the American Institute of Architects (AIA) in 1973 recommending that Komendant be honored with the AIA's Allied Professions Medal. According to his obituary in the New York Times, in 1978 the AIA awarded Komendant a medal, the name of which is not specified in the obituary, for "inspiring or influencing the architectural profession".
