= Chldran =

Chldran / Childiran Չլդրան / Çıldıran
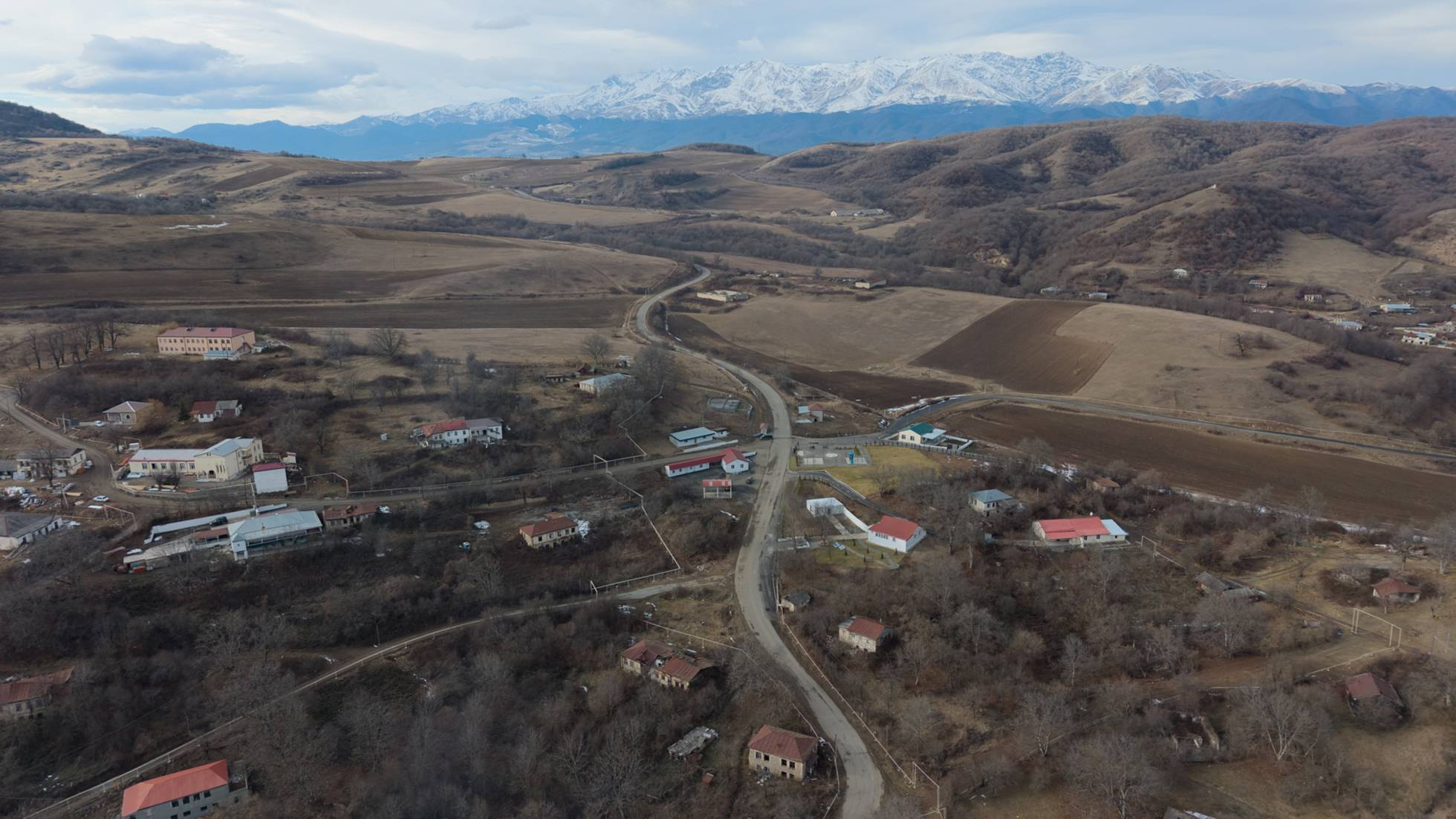

- Location within Azerbaijan Location within East Zangezur Economic Region
- Coordinates: 40°06′13″N 46°38′44″E
- Country: Azerbaijan
  - District: Aghdara

Population (2015)
  - Total: 528
- Time zone: UTC+4 (AZT)

Chldran (Armenian: Չլդրան) or Childiran (Azerbaijani: Çıldıran) is a village in the Aghdara District of Azerbaijan, in the region of Nagorno-Karabakh. Until 2023 it was controlled by the breakaway Republic of Artsakh. The village had an ethnic Armenian-majority population until the expulsion of the Armenian population of Nagorno-Karabakh by Azerbaijan following the 2023 Azerbaijani offensive in Nagorno-Karabakh.

The village is made up of six neighborhoods: Vrtskaler, Kyurkoreg, Perin Gomer, Khor Dzor, Pokr Chldran and Ghalunts Tagh.

== Etymology ==
According to Arsène Saparov, the name of the village is of Persian origin. According to Sergey Melkumyan, the name originated from the name of the ethnically Armenian Chali brothers, due to their patriotism.

== History ==
The modern village of Chldran was founded in 1905, by settlers from Arajadzor. During the Soviet period, the village was a part of the Mardakert District of the Nagorno-Karabakh Autonomous Oblast.

== Historical heritage sites ==
Historical heritage sites in and around the village include the 16th/17th-century church of Karmir Yeghtsi 300 m to the north, the partially ruined Nahatak Church 2.2 km to the northeast, with an adjacent cemetery with khachkars, and the religious site of Tatver 3.5 km to the northeast.

== Economy and culture ==
The population is mainly engaged in agriculture and animal husbandry. As of 2015, the village has a municipal building, a secondary school, nine shops, and a medical centre. The village school named after Tigran Izmirlian was destroyed in the First Nagorno-Karabakh War. It was rebuilt in 2002, and a renovation and expansion project, jointly sponsored by the Artsakh government, Armenia Fund and the Izmirlian Foundation, commenced in 2020.

== Demographics ==
The village had an ethnic Armenian-majority population, with 467 inhabitants in 2005, and 528 inhabitants in 2015. According to one study, the village had an Azerbaijani-majority population prior to their exodus during the First Nagorno-Karabakh War. According to Melkumyan's book, the village has been solely inhabited by Armenians. In 1970 the village had 87 houses and 366 inhabitants, and by 1987 there were 173 houses and 476 inhabitants.

As of January 2026 the 13 Azerbaijani families, totaling 48 individuals, have been resettled in the Childiran village by Azerbaijan.
