= Johannes van der Horst =

Dutch modern pentathlete

Personal information
- Born: 10 August 1909 The Hague, Netherlands
- Died: 14 September 1992 (aged 83) Doorn, Netherlands

Sport
- Sport: Modern pentathlon

Johannes van der Horst (10 August 1909 – 14 September 1992) was a Dutch modern pentathlete. He competed at the 1936 Summer Olympics.
