= John Ryan Davey =

Australian cricketer

Personal information
- Born: 20 September 1913; Broken Hill, New South Wales, Australia
- Died: 6 September 1992 (aged 78); Unley, South Australia
- Source: Cricinfo, 24 July 2018

John Ryan Davey (20 September 1913 – 6 September 1992) was an Australian cricketer. He played five first-class matches for South Australia between 1933 and 1935.

== See also ==
- List of South Australian representative cricketers
