= Fredrik Hetty =

Norwegian footballer (1905-1992)

Personal information
- Date of birth: 24 January 1905
- Date of death: 15 September 1992 (aged 87)

International career
Years	Team	Apps	(Gls)
1928	Norway	2	(0)

Fredrik Hetty (24 January 1905 – 15 September 1992) was a Norwegian footballer. He played in two matches for the Norway national football team in 1928.
