= Martin Eberle =

German weightlifter

Personal information
- Nationality: German
- Born: 20 December 1930; Memmingen, Germany
- Died: 15 September 1992 (aged 61); Memmingen, Germany

Sport
- Sport: Weightlifting

Martin Eberle (20 December 1930 – 15 September 1992) was a German weightlifter. He competed in the men's featherweight event at the 1964 Summer Olympics.
