= M. B. Ramachandra Rao =

Indian geophysicist (1906–1992)

- Born: 5 August 1906; British India
- Died: 4 September 1992 (aged 86)
- Occupation: Geophysicist
- Known for: Writings on geophysics
- Awards: Padma Bhushan

Mandagere Bhyrappa Ramachandra Rao (5 August 1906 – 4 September 1992) was an Indian geophysicist, writer and one of the founding leaders of the Oil and Natural Gas Commission (ONGC). It was Rao who was reported to have identified Patiala House as the headquarters of the organization. Born in the Mysore state of British India, (present-day Karnataka state), on 5 August 1906, he secured his post graduate degree (MSc) from the University of Mysore before joining the Geological Survey of India (GSI). Later, when the Oil and Natural Gas Commission was formed in 1956, he joined the organization along with a number of geoscientists from GSI where he served for a number of years.

Rao published several scientific articles and a number of books on geophysics. He was an elected fellow of the Indian Academy of Sciences. The Government of India awarded him the third highest civilian honour of the Padma Bhushan, in 1972, for his contributions to science. He died on 4 September 1992, at the age of 86.

== See also ==
- Oil and Natural Gas Commission
- Geological Survey of India
