= Victoria Wolff =

German born American writer and screenwriter

- Born: 10 December 1903; Heilbronn
- Died: 16 September 1992 (aged 88); Los Angeles
- Other names: Ellinor Colling; Claudia Martell; Hans Baysen; Trude Wolf

Victoria Wolff (10 December 1903 in Heilbronn, Germany – 16 September 1992 in Los Angeles, United States), a German born American writer and screenwriter.

== Biography ==
Born Gertrude Victor in Heilbronn on 10 December 1903 to the Jewish leather manufacturer Jacob Victor, Wolff often gave her birth year as 1908. She was educated in the local grammar school from 1917 where she was the first girl to do so and the only one trying for her exams in 1922. She went on to study chemistry with the intention of taking over her father's business as she was his only heir. However, she finally gave that up to focus on writing. Her bachelor's degree was from the Ludwig-Maximilians-Universität München in 1929. Wolff completed her master's degree at the University of Lausanne in 1931. She started writing reports for local newspapers and worked her way through a number of bigger publications, including the Frankfurter Zeitung, the Kölnische Zeitung, the Stuttgarter Neue Tagblatt and Die Dame, before getting short stories published in the Süddeutscher Rundfunk. Her first marriage was to the textile manufacturer Dr. Alfred Max Wolf, with whom she had two children.

Wolff published her first novel, Eine Frau wie du und ich, in 1932, and her second, Mädchen, wohin?, came out the following year. When the Nazi party came to power, however, she was barred from the Reich Association of German Writers on account of her Jewishness, and she went into exile in Switzerland in April 1933. She first settled in Ascona, writing prolifically until 1938, when she was no longer permitted to write for the Swiss media. When she circumvented this rule using a pen name, she was deported from the country. She moved to France and settled in Nice, but after the German invasion of 1940 she was arrested on supposed grounds of espionage and was jailed for six weeks. She found refuge in the United States in 1941 and eventually settled in Los Angeles, where she had success as a Hollywood screenwriter. She divorced her first husband in the late 1940s and in 1949 married Erich Wolff. She continued writing essays, stories, novels, and screenplays.

After the end of the Second World War, Wolff was able to return to Heilbronn, and visited the city regularly from 1949 to 1985. She died in Los Angeles on September 16, 1992. She is remembered in her school, now the Robert Mayer Gymnasium, with a Prize for performance in art, music, literature and theater. In 2002 Julie Amador, her daughter, attended the first award ceremony.

== Limited bibliography ==
=== Novels ===
- Eine Frau wie du und ich (1932)
- Mädchen, wohin? (1933)
- Eine Frau hat Mut (1933)
- Die Welt ist blau (1934)
- Gast in der Heimat (1935)
- Glück ist eine Eigenschaft (1937)
- Drei Tage (1937)
- Das weisse Abendkleid (1939)
- The Spell of Egypt (König im Tal der Könige) (1943/1945)
- Keine Zeit für Tränen (1954)
- Liebe ist immer anders (1955)
- Stadt ohne Unschuld (Fabulous City) (1956/1957)
- Ein anderer Mann (Breakdown) (1962/1958)
- Bräute für Amerika (1962)
- Mutter und Tochter (1964)
- Lügen haben langen Beine (1964)
- Liebe auf Kap Kennedy (1970)
