= David Cock =

English cricketer (1914–1992)

Personal information
- Full name: David Frederick Cock
- Born: 22 October 1914; Great Dunmow, Essex, England
- Died: 29 September 1992 (aged 77); Uttlesford, Essex, England
- Batting: Right-handed
- Role: Occasional wicket-keeper

Domestic team information
- Years: Team
- 1951: Cambridgeshire
- 1939–1946: Essex

Career statistics
Competition	First-class
Matches	14
Runs scored	355
Batting average	19.72
100s/50s	–/2
Top score	98
Balls bowled	–
Wickets	–
Bowling average	–
5 wickets in innings	–
10 wickets in match	–
Best bowling	–
Catches/stumpings	5/–
- Source: Cricinfo, 26 October 2011

David Frederick Cock (22 October 1914 – 26 September 1992) was an English cricketer. Cock was a right-handed batsman who occasionally fielded as a wicket-keeper. He was born at Great Dunmow, Essex.

Cock made his first-class debut for Essex against Kent in the 1939 County Championship. He made eleven first-class appearances in that season. He scored 326 runs in this season, which came at an average of 23.28, which included two half centuries. His first half century came against Sussex when he made 79 not out. His second half century saw him narrowly miss out on a century when he made 98 against Somerset at Chalkwell Park. World War II ended first-class cricket in England for the duration of that conflict. Cock served during the war in the Royal Air Force, holding the rank of acting pilot officer in February 1941. However, on 27 May 1942 he resigned his commission. Following the war he resumed his career with Essex, playing in three first-class matches in the 1946 County Championship, with his final appearance coming against Surrey. He played no further matches for Essex after this season. In total, Cock played fourteen matches for Essex, scoring 355 runs at an average of 19.72.

In 1951, he played a single Minor Counties Championship match for Cambridgeshire against Lincolnshire. He died on 26 September 1992 at Uttlesford, Essex.

On 18 February 1985, The David Cock Foundation was set up using David’s legacy, and the proceeds of the sale of part of David’s farmland in Essex, to benefit charities.
