= Darío Cabanelas =

Professor of Arabic and Islamic Studies

Darío Cabanelas Rodríguez (20 December 1916 – 18 September 1992) was a Spanish Arabist whose work influenced Arab studies in the 20th century. He was born and died in Trasalba, Ourense, Spain.

After studying baccalaureate, philosophy and theology in Santiago de Compostela, he was ordained as a priest into the Franciscan Religious Order on June 23, 1940. From 1942, he studied philosophy and humanities, Section of Semitic Philology, at Central University, called today Complutense University, in Madrid, with Extraordinary Degree Award, and he got the doctorate on 15 June 1948, about the topic Juan de Segovia y el problema islámico, with a Special Award Doctorate. He was a holder of a scholarship and a collaborator at Miguel Asín Palacios Institute of Spanish National Research Council.

He taught Arabic language and literature at the Complutense University of Madrid and from 1955 was Professor at the University of Granada. He was a disciple of Emilio García Gómez, he trained a lot of professionals during four generations for more than forty years. His scientific contributions are very extensive: he wrote over 100 works, among books, articles, bibliographical reviews and reports, as well as being director of 18 doctorates, 26 master dissertations, etcetera, and lectured on the Arab and Islamic world in Spain and abroad. He specialized mainly in Arabic linguistics, literature and philosophy, and among his most outstanding works are his writings on Ibn Sida and Alonso del Castillo.

Throughout his career, he held numerous high academic positions. These included:

- Dean of the Faculty of Philosophy and Humanities in Granada (1965–1968)
- Director of Department of Arabic in Granada (1972–1987)
- Director of the School of Arabic Studies of Spanish National Research Council in Granada (1972–1984)
- Membership of Royal Academy of Fine Arts in Granada (1977–1992)
- President of Alhambra and Generalife Council's Publications Commission (1978–1985)
- Membership "al honorem" of Institute for Cooperation with the Arab World of the Foreign Office in Spain (1979–1992)

He retired in 1985, and in 1987, he was named Professor Emeritus of the University of Granada.
