= Yngve Casslind =

Swedish ice hockey player (1932–1992)

- Born: 28 June 1932 Mörkö, Sweden
- Died: 17 September 1992 (aged 60) Stockholm, Sweden
- Position: Goaltender
- Caught: Left
- Played for: IK Göta; Skellefteå AIK
- National team: Sweden
- Playing career: 1951–1963

Yngve Hilmer Casslind (28 June 1932 – 17 September 1992) was a Swedish ice hockey player. He competed in the men's tournament at the 1956 Winter Olympics.
