= Arajadzor, Nagorno-Karabakh =

Village in Aghdara, Azerbaijan

Arajadzor / Dovshanly Առաջաձոր / Dovşanlı
- Location within Azerbaijan Location within East Zangezur Economic Region
- Coordinates: 40°03′37″N 46°36′40″E
- Country: Azerbaijan
- Region: Nagorno-Karabakh
- District: Aghdara

Population (2015)
  - Total: 787
- Time zone: UTC+4 (AZT)

Arajadzor (Armenian: Առաջաձոր) or Dovshanly (Azerbaijani: Dovşanlı) is a village located in the Aghdara District of Azerbaijan, in the region of Nagorno-Karabakh. Until 2023 it was controlled by the breakaway Republic of Artsakh. The village had an ethnic Armenian-majority population until the expulsion of the Armenian population of Nagorno-Karabakh by Azerbaijan following the 2023 Azerbaijani offensive in Nagorno-Karabakh.

== History ==
During the Soviet period, the village was part of the Mardakert District of the Nagorno-Karabakh Autonomous Oblast.

== Historical heritage sites ==
Historical heritage sites in and around the village include tombs from the 2nd–1st millennia BCE, a 12th/13th-century khachkar, the 12th/13th-century fortress of Tsiranakar (Armenian: Ծիրանաքար), the Harva Church (Armenian: Հարվա եկեղեցի) built in 1249, and the church of Surb Astvatsatsin (Armenian: Սուրբ Աստվածածին, lit. 'Holy Mother of God') built in 1668.

== Economy and culture ==
The population is mainly engaged in agriculture and animal husbandry. As of 2015, the village has a municipal building, a secondary school, a kindergarten, and a medical centre.

== Demographics ==
The village had 741 inhabitants in 2005, and 787 inhabitants in 2015.
