= Johanna Piesch =

Austrian mathematician

Johanna (Hansi) Camilla Piesch (1898–1992) was an Austrian librarian, physicist and mathematician who is remembered for the pioneering contributions she made to switching algebra, one of the fundamentals of digital computing and programming languages.

== Biography ==
Born on 6 June 1898 in Innsbruck, Johanna Camilla Piesch was the daughter of Oswald Piesch, a cavalry officer. She was brought up in Vienna where after primary school, she attended secondary school at the Reform Realgymnasium Dr. Wesely, matriculating in 1916. She went on to study physics at the University of Vienna, earning a doctorate in 1921. In addition, she received a teaching qualification in mathematics and physics in 1928.

She joined the Post and Telegraph Service (Post- und Telegraphenverwaltung) in 1928, but had to take up early retirement in 1938 under the National Socialist regime. In July 1945, she was able to return to work, heading the PTT's laboratory. In February 1956, she moved to the library of the Technical University's documentation centre for technology and science. She retired in October 1962.

It appears that after leaving her post in 1938, Piesch was sent to Berlin, where she began to work on switching algebra. This is supported by her publications on Boolean algebra in 1939, making her the first person to address its applications. In so doing, she paved the way for the Austrian mathematicians Adalbert Duschek and Otto Plechl who later undertook work on switching algebra. The simplification method put forward in her second publication is of particular note.

The last 30 years of Piesch's life were devoted to social work. She died on 28 September 1992 in Vienna. Her work is widely considered of significance to the development of computer science.

== Publications ==
Johanna Piesch's significant publications include:

- 1939: Piesch, H., "Begriff der Allgerneinen Schaltungstechnik" (Concept of General Switching Theory), Archiv für Elektrotechnik, Vol. 33, pp. 672–686.
- 1939: Piesch, H., "Über die Vereinfachung von Allgeneinen Schaltungen" (On the Simplification of General Switching Circuits), Archiv fürElektrotechnik, Vol. 33, pp. 733–746.
- 1951: Piesch, H., "Systematik der Autornatischen Schaltung" (Systematics of Automatic Switching), OFT, Vol. 5, pp. 2–43.
- 1955: Piesch, H., "Die Matrix in der Schaltungsalebgra zur Planung Relaisgesteuerter Netzwerke" (Matrices in Switching Algebra for the Design of Relay Controlled Networks), Archiv für elektrische Übertragung, Vol. 9, pp. 460–468.
- 1956: Piesch, H., "Beitrdge zur Modernen Schaltalgebra" (Contributions to Modern Switching Algebra), Conference in Como, pp. 16–25.
- 1958: Piesch, H., and Sequenz, H, "Die Österreichischen Wegbereiter der Theorie der Elektrischen Schaltungen" (The Austrian Pioneers of the Theory of Electrical Switching), Elecktrotechnik & Maschinenbau, Vol. 75, pp. 241–245.
