= André Peton =

French cyclist

Personal information
- Born: 12 January 1903
- Died: 20 September 1992 (aged 89)

Cycling career
- Sport: Cycling
- Discipline: Road
- Role: Rider

André Peton (12 January 1903 – 20 September 1992) was a French racing cyclist. He rode in the 1926 Tour de France.
