= Sanun Tiamsert =

Thai weightlifter

Personal information
- Nationality: Thai
- Born: 31 January 1939 (age 86); Bangkok, Thailand

Sport
- Sport: Weightlifting

Sanun Tiamsert (born 31 January 1939) is a Thai weightlifter. He competed at the 1964 Summer Olympics and the 1968 Summer Olympics.
