= Johannes Zoet =

Dutch fencer (1908–1992)

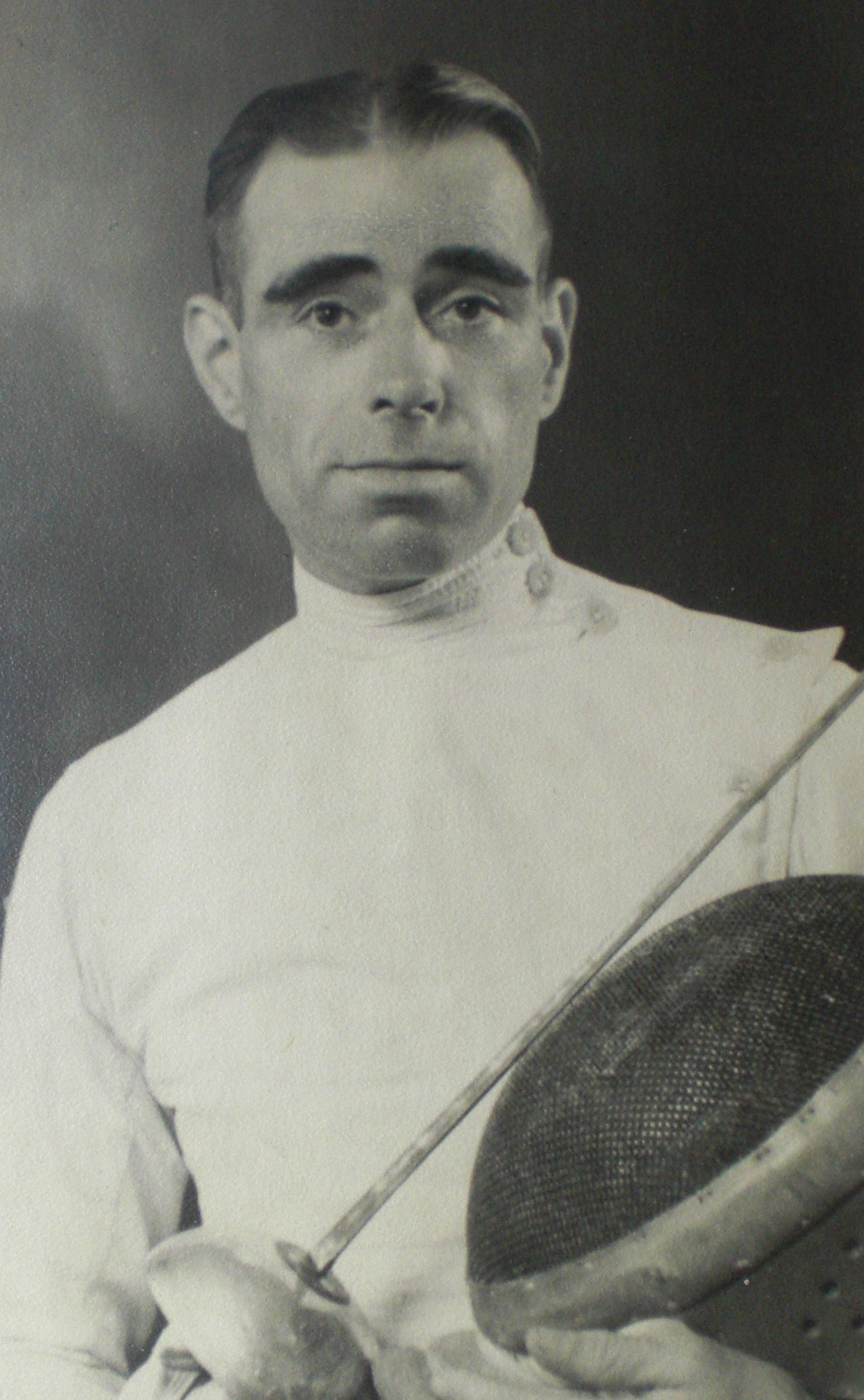
- Johannes Zoet in 1944

Personal information
- Full name: Johannes Adrianus Zoet
- Born: 12 October 1908 The Hague, Netherlands
- Died: 7 September 1992 (aged 83) Rijswijk, Netherlands

Sport
- Sport: Fencing

Johannes Zoet (12 October 1908 – 7 September 1992) was a Dutch fencer. He competed in the individual foil event at the 1948 Summer Olympics.
