= Martha McDonald =

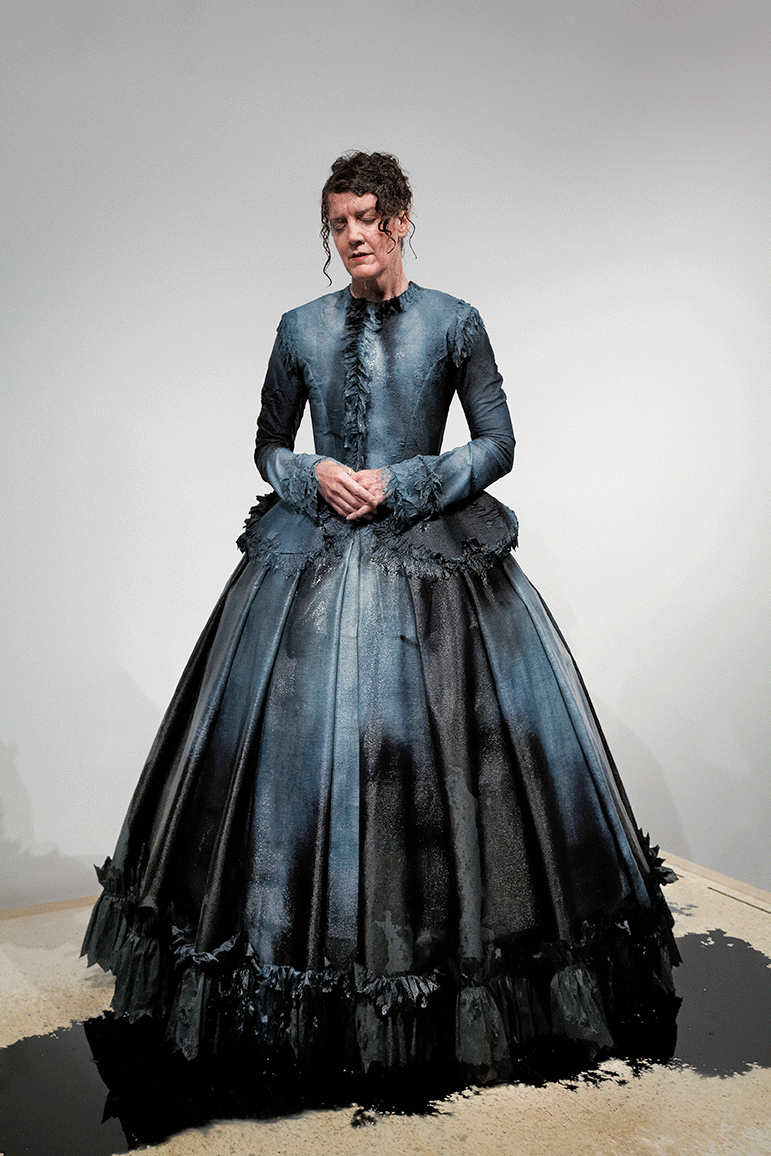
- Martha McDonald, The Weeping Dress, Craft Victoria, Melbourne, Australia, 2011
- Born: 1964 (age 61–62); Pittsburgh, PA
- Education: Pennsylvania State University, Monash University
- Known for: site-specific performance and installation, costume, music
- Awards: Smithsonian Artist Research Fellowship (SARF), PA Council on the Arts Fellowship, Independence Foundation Fellowship
- Website: marthamcdonald.com

Martha McDonald (born 1964) is an American interdisciplinary artist who blends music, singing, dance, and storytelling with site-specific installations of handmade costumes and objects. Her projects, covering the themes of absence, memory, mourning, and transformation, often begin with in-depth investigations into archives and local histories.

Her 2023 residency at Wharton Esherick Museum, Malvern, PA culminated in the performance The Wood is Singing in Color, which explored lesser-known aspects of artist Wharton Esherick. In Music for Modernist Shapes: Reimagining Spectodrama at Black Mountain College Museum + Arts Center, McDonald created sculptures and costumes drawing from Bauhaus artist Xanti Schawinsky. One of her best-known works, The Weeping Dress, explored Victorian mourning culture and fashion.

== Early life ==
McDonald was born and raised in Pittsburgh, Pennsylvania in 1964. She studied piano and received classical vocal training. She earned a Bachelor’s degree in English from Pennsylvania State University, where she was introduced to Baroque music.

== Career ==
After completing her degree, McDonald worked as a freelance journalist, a museum docent, and a fundraiser with the Maternity Care Coalition. In the 1990s, she co-founded Belladonna, a music ensemble performing 17th- and 18th-century bawdy songs and ballads, often reframed through a feminist lens. Around the same period, she performed with the Big Mess Cabaret, a Philadelphia-based collective of experimental theater artists. Her early work featured monologues she wrote based on research into mythological characters and Baroque opera heroines. She received regional press and recognition for many of them including: Diva Trouble: The Death of Dido and Other Diversions (2000), Girls on the Rocks: A Mermaid’s Tale (2001), and Madwomen Unplugged (1999).

In the early 2000s, McDonald was commissioned to respond to the collection of rare books, 18th century furniture and decorative arts at the Rosenbach Museum and Library in Philadelphia. In Petals From the Same Flower, her first site-specific piece, McDonald guided the audience through the museum, focusing on objects that were pretending to be something else, Chinoiserie mirrors, Empire style furniture, and Shakespeare forgeries, while clothed in an 18th-century dress made in contemporary patterned fabrics.

Lament, a 2006 performance presented as part of Soft Sites through the Institute of Contemporary Art, Philadelphia, strengthened her new format outside the theater space. McDonald performed outdoors at Bartram’s Garden in collaboration with artist Katie Holten. Focusing on the extinction of plants and John Bartram’s 18th-century botanical garden, McDonald led participants through segments of Bartram’s Garden and performed a vocal lament at the river’s edge before departing in a canoe.

In 2008, McDonald relocated to Melbourne, Australia where she pursued a Master of Fine Art at Monash University. Her work shifted to focus on the creation of handmade objects, costumes, and material explorations. Addressing her dislocation from her home in the United States, she studied Victorian mourning culture and reconnected with Appalachian folk music. McDonald's performances often focus on the themes of memory and longing, and she continues to explore unique, historical materials and forms through her work.

Since her return to the United States in 2012, McDonald has deepened her research into historical artists, material practices, and forms. Her projects often begin with in-depth investigations into archives and local histories, focusing on the ways cultural narratives are embodied through material practices.

Through a Smithsonian Artist Research Fellowship in 2023, McDonald studied the Appalachian dulcimer at the National Museum of American History and Center for Folklife and Cultural Heritage.

== Themes and practice ==
=== Material explorations ===
Many of McDonald’s installations and objects are constructed in unconventional materials inspired by her research. Past projects have referenced historical handcrafts connecting her process to women’s domestic labor and other overlooked histories of making. Others utilize the resources and material histories of their respective sites. McDonald’s performance costumes often serve a dual purpose as sculptures activated through dance and movement during the performance.

==== The Wood is Singing in Color ====
The Wood is Singing in Color was a live performance at the Wharton Esherick Museum in Malvern, PA. Through archival and material research during her 2023 artist residency, McDonald explored less familiar dimensions of American artist and woodworker Wharton Esherick’s practice, such as his prismatic theater set design, engagement with Rudolf Steiner’s anthroposophy and the broader spiritualist movement, and Esherick’s lyrical writings. McDonald conducted immersive research as well, staying overnight in Esherick’s farmhouse, Sunekrest, while engaging with his sketches, watercolors, letters, and ephemera.

Drawing on Esherick’s work, McDonald created songs, costumes, and sculptural props. Collaborating with musicians Brooke Sietinsons and Miriam Goldberg, fashion designer Dana Meyer, and woodworkers Casey Chew and Larissa Huff, McDonald performed in the 1956 workshop Esherick designed with architect Louis Kahn.

The Wharton Esherick Museum has described McDonald’s approach as “responsive, with aspects of form, design, movement, lyric, and collaboration coming together to produce the final piece,” underscoring her practice’s synthesis of research and performance.

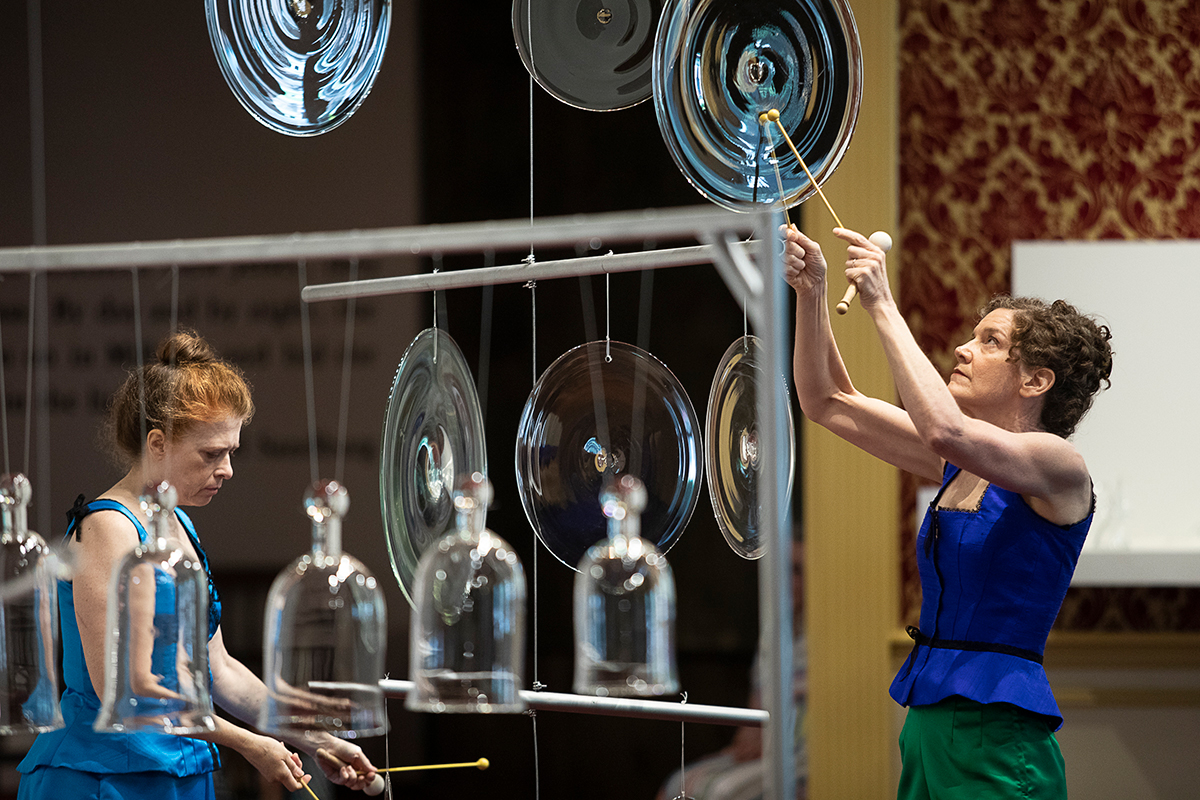
Martha McDonald, Phantom Frequencies (2019), WheatonArts

==== Phantom Frequencies ====
Phantom Frequencies was a 2019 site-specific installation and performance McDonald created in collaboration with composer and musician Laura Baird for Emanation 2019 at WheatonArts and Cultural Center in Millville, NJ. Glass objects from Wheaton’s permanent collection were reproduced by the on-site glassmakers and played as musical instruments. In a costume based on a Victorian hoop-skirt, hundreds of glass medicine vials hung from the skirt, which McDonald activated and “played” as an instrument through dance and movement. She and collaborator Laura Baird played other glass instruments such as gongs, bells, and horns that became the installation for the ongoing exhibition outside the performances.

The work activated the museum’s 1970s lobby, designed to simulate a Victorian parlor. Presented as a “mini-opera,” Phantom Frequencies channeled the spirit of amateur parlor music once performed in domestic interiors, while simultaneously conjuring ethereal acoustics for an imagined future.

==== Music for Modernist Shapes: Reimagining Spectodrama ====
Music for Modernist Shapes: Reimagining Spectodrama was a 2017 performance and installation by McDonald commissioned by the Black Mountain College Museum + Arts Center in Asheville, North Carolina. The project reimagined Bauhaus theatermaker Xanti Schawinsky’s 1936 experimental theater work Spectodrama: Play, Life, Illusion, which merged performance, light projection, music, and color theory to animate the principles of Bauhaus design. During her residency, McDonald immersed herself in the pedagogical legacies of the Bauhaus and Black Mountain College. She created a series of paper sculptures and costumes that drew from Josef Albers’ paper-folding techniques used in Schawinsky’s original performance with students at the college.

The installation was activated through live performance, featuring original music composed by Laura Baird, whose score drew from Schawinsky’s collaborations with John Evarts, a Black Mountain College music faculty member, as well as from 1930s avant-garde compositions and Appalachian folk traditions.

=== Memory and longing ===
Themes of memory, longing, absence, and loss are frequent themes of McDonald’s interdisciplinary practice. Her performances and installations often draw on historical mourning rituals, particularly those associated with women’s domestic and emotional labor. In The Garden (1999), she explored the deaths of her brother and mother-in-law using a bed filled with garden soil that she attempted to bury herself in. In drown’d (2005), McDonald performed as Penelope, the wife of Ulysses from The Odyssey. Over the course of the piece, she knitted and unraveled a giant afghan, referencing Penelope’s three years of weaving to delay the approach of potential suitors while mourning her husband.

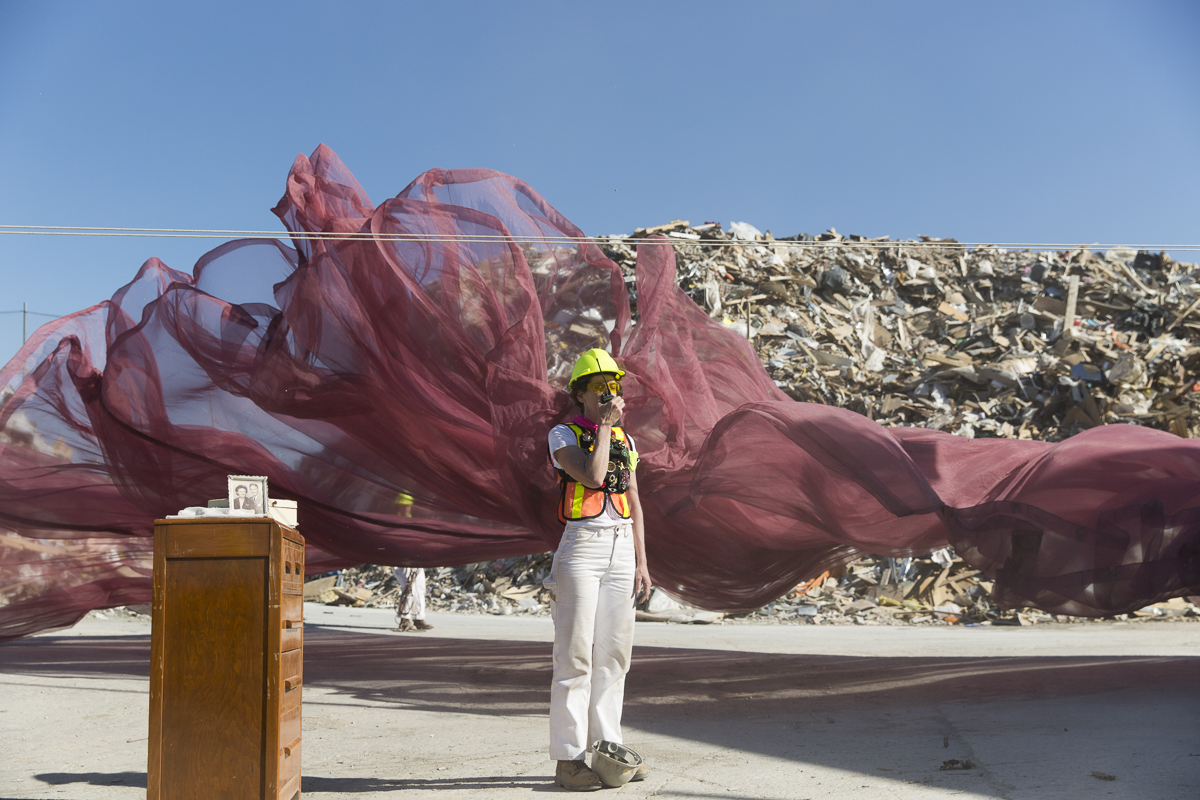
Martha McDonald, Songs of Memory and Forgetting (2016), RAIR (Recycled Artist in Residency), Philadelphia, PA, Music in collaboration with Billy Dufala, Photo: Ryan Collerd

==== Songs of Memory and Forgetting ====
Created during her 2016 residency with RAIR (Recycled Artist in Residency) at Revolution Recovery, a construction and demolition recycling center in Philadelphia, Songs of Memory and Forgetting combined song, storytelling and found-object sculpture. Sourcing thousands of photos, articles of clothing, instruments and objects from the piles of trash, McDonald created quilts from the photos and displayed a collection of rescued personal belongings; while she performed original and traditional songs with RAIR co-founder Billy Dufala on instruments and constructed sound sculptures.

The Wall Street Journal and Broad Street Review described the performance as “quietly riveting,” noting McDonald’s ability to transform discarded objects into “carriers of memory and mourning.”

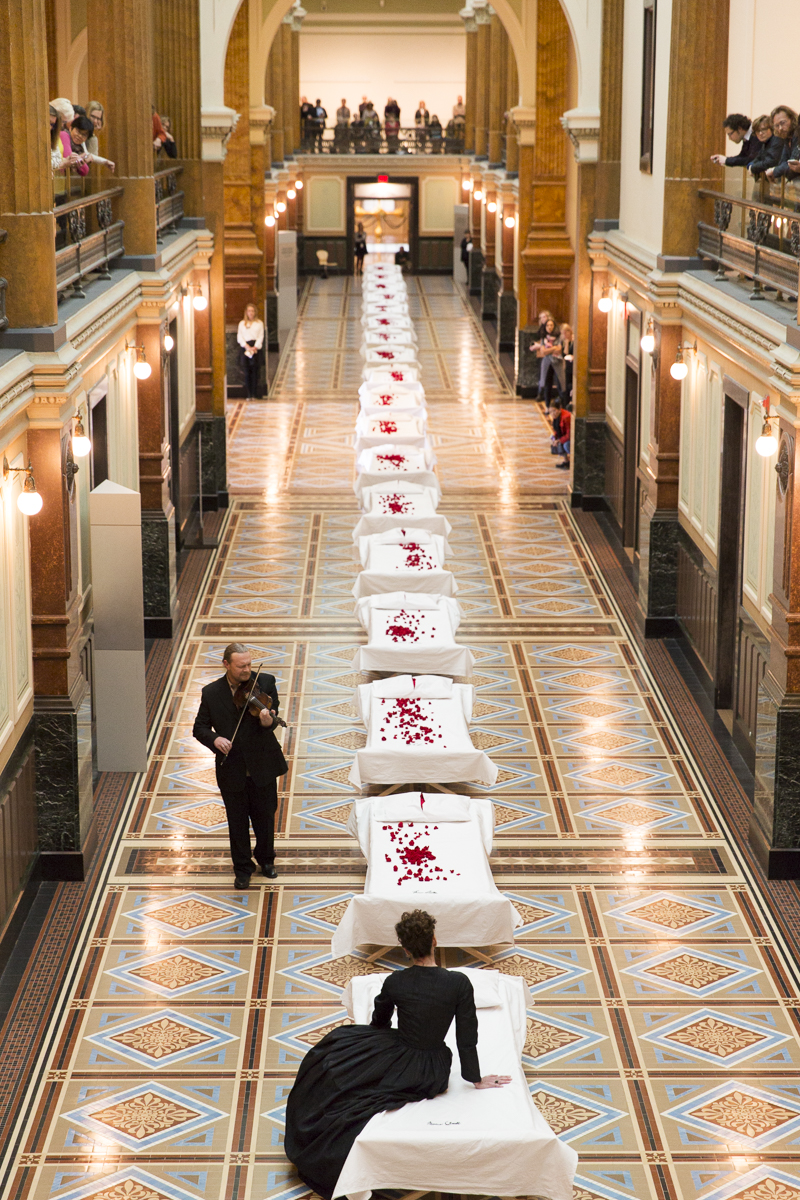
Martha McDonald, Hospital Hymn: Elegy for Lost Soldiers (2015), Smithsonian National Portrait Gallery, Washington, D.C., Photo: Ryan Collerd, Fiddle: Craig Woodward

==== Hospital Hymn: Elegy for Lost Soldiers ====
Hospital Hymn: Elegy for Lost Soldiers was a 2015 performance commissioned through the IDENTIFY series and exhibited at the Smithsonian National Portrait Gallery to accompany the exhibition Dark Fields of the Republic: Alexander Gardner Photographs, 1859–1872. The piece was performed in the museum’s Great Hall, which was used as a hospital during the American Civil War where poet Walt Whitman worked as a nurse. McDonald explored Whitman’s writings on unknown soldiers, death, and nature’s role in mourning.

The installation featured a long row of cots draped in white sheets and pillowcases concealing red felt flowers. During the performance, McDonald released the bright red flowers by slicing open the pillowcases, symbolizing both battlefield wounds and the overwhelming grief of survivors. The work explored how personal and collective loss resonate across history, connecting Civil War trauma to contemporary experiences of public grief.

Craig Woodward played fiddle and concertina while McDonald sang traditional hymns mentioned in Whitman’s notebooks. Woodward has accompanied McDonald in many projects dating back to her time in Australia: Deep Sea Chanties (2012) aboard "HMAS" Blackbird, The Weeping Dress (2011) at Craft Victoria and The Further the Distance, the Tighter the Knot (2009) at the Linden Centre for Contemporary Arts.

==== The Lost Garden ====
The Lost Garden (2014) at The Woodlands in Philadelphia explored impermanence in relation to the history of the location as a botanic garden and greenhouse owned by William Hamilton. The rapid urbanization of the 19th century nearly overtook the garden, but it was saved by transforming the site into a cemetery. Referencing Victorian wax flowers and hair jewelry, McDonald knitted replicas of plants to memorialize the lost plants from Hamilton’s garden.

==== Deep Sea Chanties ====
Deep Sea Chanties was a 2012 performance, installation, and journey on "HMAS" Blackbird from Melbourne, Australia to The Substation exhibition space in Newport. On the Blackbird, McDonald performed 19th-century sea shanties alongside musician Craig Woodward, exploring how sailors sang to cope with homesickness and fear during long sea voyages. After disembarking, attendees entered The Substation, a former electrical substation for the railway system, where McDonald’s installation displayed nautical knots and a vintage phonograph playing her rendition of The Grey Funnel Line. The work was commissioned by The Substation for the Stories from the city, stories from the sea exhibition, with a related seven-inch vinyl record edition commissioned by Satellite Art Projects.

==== The Weeping Dress ====
The 2011 performance and installation The Weeping Dress explored grief and loss through costume, song and material transformation, referencing the mourning rituals of Victorian women. McDonald wore a black Victorian-style dress made from crepe paper to reference 19th-century mourning fashions that were dyed with fugitive, plant-based dyes. During a 20-minute performance, McDonald sang as water dripped from the ceiling above. As the water saturated the costume, the dyes bled across McDonald’s body and wept a reflective black ink puddle across the wooden stage. The piece has been exhibited internationally, including at Craft Victoria as part of the 2011 L’Oreal Melbourne Fashion Festival; The Tamworth Textile Triennial, which toured Australia; and later at the Zuckerman Museum of Art’s exhibition This Mortal Coil (2021). Critics described the piece as a “haunting" meditation on grief and an evocative metaphor for how loss physically and emotionally marks the body.

==== Crying Portraits ====
Crying Portraits (2010) in the On Life After Death exhibition at the gallery Death Be Kind featured photos of McDonald in tears wearing the crepe paper mourning dress, The Weeping Dress. Her neck and body were stained by the crepe paper running color, symbolizing the mark of loss and absence of a loved one. An empty wooden box contained a recording of McDonald humming an American folk song. Viewers were invited to open the box to hear the song and feel the vibration of McDonald’s voice.

==== The Further the Distance, the Tighter the Knot ====
The Further the Distance, the Tighter the Knot (2009) was presented at the Linden Centre for Contemporary Arts, a repurposed Victorian family home in Melbourne, Australia. Conceived during McDonald’s relocation from Philadelphia to Australia, the performance and installation was composed of hand-knit memento mori, inspired by 19th-century handcrafts that were historically made from human hair to memorialize lost loved ones.

== Recognition ==
McDonald’s achievements have been recognized through numerous fellowships, residencies, and awards, including a Smithsonian Artist Research Fellowship (2023), Artist-in-Residence at the Wharton Esherick Museum (2023), and Performing Arts Residency at the John Michael Kohler Arts Center (2018). She has also been awarded residencies and fellowships at the Black Mountain College Museum + Arts Center (2017), Pew Center Performance Artist Resident at RAIR (2016), Smithsonian National Portrait Gallery (2015), Artist-in-Residence at Evergreen Museum & Library, Johns Hopkins University, Baltimore, MD (2007) and MacDowell (2003). Additional honors include the Leeway Foundation Art and Change Grant (2014), Pennsylvania Council on the Arts Fellowship in New Performance Forms (2006), and the Independence Foundation Fellowship in the Performing Arts (2004).

Her work is represented in several public collections, including the Museum of American Glass (Wheaton Arts and Cultural Center, NJ), Tamworth Regional Gallery (Australia), the State Library Victoria (Melbourne), Monash University Library Artist Book Collection, and the Victorian College of the Arts Library.

== Personal life ==
McDonald is married to Alex Baker, a contemporary art curator. He shares her musical interests; Baker’s father was an opera singer and mother was a musicologist and harpsichordist. In 2008, McDonald relocated to Melbourne, Australia, when her husband joined the National Gallery of Victoria as a senior curator of contemporary art.

== Notable works ==
- Hospital Hymns: Elegy for Lost Soldiers
- The Lost Garden
- The Weeping Dress
