= Esherick =

Esherick may refer to:

- Craig Esherick (born 1956), basketball coach
- Joseph Esherick (architect) (1914–1998), American architect
- Joseph W. Esherick (born 1942), historian of Chinese history
- Wharton Esherick (1887–1970), American woodcarver and printmaker
- Esherick House, Chestnut Hill, Pennsylvania
