= Joseph Esherick =

Joseph Esherick may refer to:

- Joseph Esherick (architect) (1914–1998), American architect
- Joseph W. Esherick, professor of modern Chinese history at University of California, San Diego

== See also ==
- Esherick (disambiguation)
