= Dean Mosher =

American artist, author, and historian

Dean Mosher is an American artist, author, and historian from Fairhope, Alabama. He has paintings in permanent collections in several museums including the Smithsonian National Air and Space Museum, the United States Coast Guard Academy, United States Naval Academy, and the University of Virginia.

== Biography ==
Dean Mosher served five years (2002–2007) as Historian General of the Naval Order of the United States where he received the Commander General's medal in 2006 for organizing and saving the records of the organization. He lectures around the country on historical subjects, including the Wright Brothers, John Paul Jones, Oliver Hazard Perry (which he corrected historical records of), Admiral David Glasgow Farragut, Theodore Roosevelt, and D-Day. He lives in his own hand-built castle in Fairhope with his wife Pagan Sheldon Mosher. They have two children, Megrez and Cleveland.

Mosher’s most notable painting is Wilbur Wright Greets Lady Liberty. The painting depicts the only accurate portrayal of Wilbur Wright’s flight around the Statue of Liberty, as he explains in his article written for the Smithsonian. Amanda Wright-Lane, great grandniece of the Wright Brothers, and Dean Mosher donated the painting to the Smithsonian National Air and Space Museum in July and it went on permanent exhibit in the Early Flight gallery on August 1, 2013. Another noteworthy painting, Close Action, resides at War of 1812 Museum in Plattsburgh, New York.

== Paintings ==
Mosher has created several historical paintings which are on display in permanent exhibitions in museum collections, universities, and national park visitor centers:

- A Grateful Nation Remembers 14'6 x 8' oil on canvas. On permanent display at the Colonel Robert L. Howard State Veterans Home.
- Wilbur Wright Greets Lady Liberty 10:20AM September 29, 1909. 8' x 10' oil on canvas. On permanent exhibit in the Early Flight gallery of the Smithsonian National Air and Space Museum.
- Battle of Flamborough Head Captain John Paul Jones' epic battle with HMS Serapis, 9:45 September 23, 1779. 8' x 10'6" oil on canvas. Permanent collection, University of Virginia.
- I Have Not Yet Begun to Fight! Captain John Paul Jones utters his famous line 10:45 September 23, 1779. 30" x 40" oil on masonite. Permanent collection, United States Naval Academy.
- The Bishop's Boys The only time the Wright Brothers ever flew together, May 25, 1910. 8' x 10' oil on canvas. Permanent collection, Carillon Historical Park, Dayton Ohio.
- Battle of Lake Erie Oliver Hazard Perry transfers his flag, 7' x 12' oil on canvas. Permanent exhibit Perry's Victory & International Peace Memorial National Park Service Visitors Center, South Bass Island, Ohio.
- Perry Breaking the Line Oliver Hazard Perry at the Battle of Lake Erie, September 10, 1813. 7' x 12' oil on canvas. Permanent exhibit Perry's Victory & International Peace Memorial National Park Service Visitors Center, South Bass Island, Ohio.
- Founders' Vision: 'A Fair Hope of Success' 7' x 12' oil on canvas. Permanent exhibition at the Fairhope Museum of History, Fairhope, Alabama.
- Battle of Fallen Timbers 5' x 12' oil on canvas. Permanent exhibition at Fort Meigs Museum, Perrysburgh, Ohio.
- If There's a Victory to be Gained, I'll Gain It! 30" x 40" oil on masonite. Permanent exhibit Perry's Victory & International Peace Memorial National Park Service Visitors Center, South Bass Island, Ohio.
- Close Action! 30" x 40" oil on masonite. Permanent collection, Battle of Plattsburgh Association, Plattsburgh, New York
- Battle of Mobile Bay 7'6" x 16' oil on canvas. Permanent collection, Mobile Museum of Fine Arts, Mobile, Alabama.
- Damn the Torpedoes - Full Speed Ahead! 30" x 40" oil on masonite. Permanent collection, United States Naval Academy.
- USCG Cutter Bibb's Bermuda Sky Queen Rescue October 14, 1947. 9'6" x 9' oil on canvas. Permanent collection, United States Coast Guard Museum.
- The Birth of Alabama's First Great University 14'9" x 6'2" oil on canvas. Permanent collection, Gorgas Library, University of Alabama.
- Joseph A. Bentley 18" x 24" oil on canvas. Hotel Bentley, Alexandria, Louisiana.
- Buchanan's Fateful Decision, 8:30AM, August 5th, 1864, 30" x 40" oil on masonite, permanent display at Fort Morgan Museum.

=== Book illustrations ===
Dean Mosher's paintings and drawings have been featured in a number of history books.

- The Battles at Plattsburgh: September 11, 1814 by Keith A. Herkalo, foreword by Donald E. Graves (The History Press, May 22, 2012), interior illustration.
- Sixty Years' War for the Great Lakes, 1754-1814, editors David Curtis Skaggs and Larry N. Nelson, (Michigan State University Press, 2010), cover image.
- God Seekers: Twenty Centuries of Christian Spiritualties, by Richard H. Schmidt, (William B. Eerdmans Publishing Company, June 1, 2008), book jacket and interior illustrations.
- U.S. Air Force: A Complete History (Hugh Lauter Levin's Military History), pg. 21, (Universe, September 19, 2006)
- Oliver Hazard Perry: Honor, Courage and Patriotism in the Early U.S. Navy by David Curtis Skaggs, Jr., (Naval Institute Press, October 3, 2006), illustrations on pages 46–48.
- West Wind, Flood Tide: The Battle of Mobile Bay by Jack Friend, (US Naval Institute Press, February 2004), interior illustration pg. 177.
- Thomas MacDonough: Master of Command in the Early U.S. Navy by David Curtis Skaggs, Jr., (Naval Institute Press, December 1, 2002), dust jacket and interior illustrations.
- Glorious Companions: Five Centuries of Anglican Spirituality by Richard H. Schmidt (William B. Eerdmans Publishing Company, December 20, 2002), interior illustrations.
- Sages, Saints, and Seers: A Breviary of Spiritual Masters by Richard H. Schmidt (Church Publishing, Inc, May 1, 2015), interior illustrations.

== Authored works ==
Mosher has authored one book: The Spirit of Fairhope by Dean Mosher and Megrez R. Mosher (Walsworth Publishing Company, October 2, 2013).

== Public art ==
- Nature's Playground Sculpture - The sculpture was made to celebrate nature's abundance and diversity in and around Gautier, Mississippi. The statue is located in Gautier's town square and features a large heron at the top, two fish, two turtles, an alligator, and a crab. It was unveiled in March 2013.
