= War of 1812 Museum (Plattsburgh) =

Coordinates: 44°40′55.15″N 73°26′44.66″W

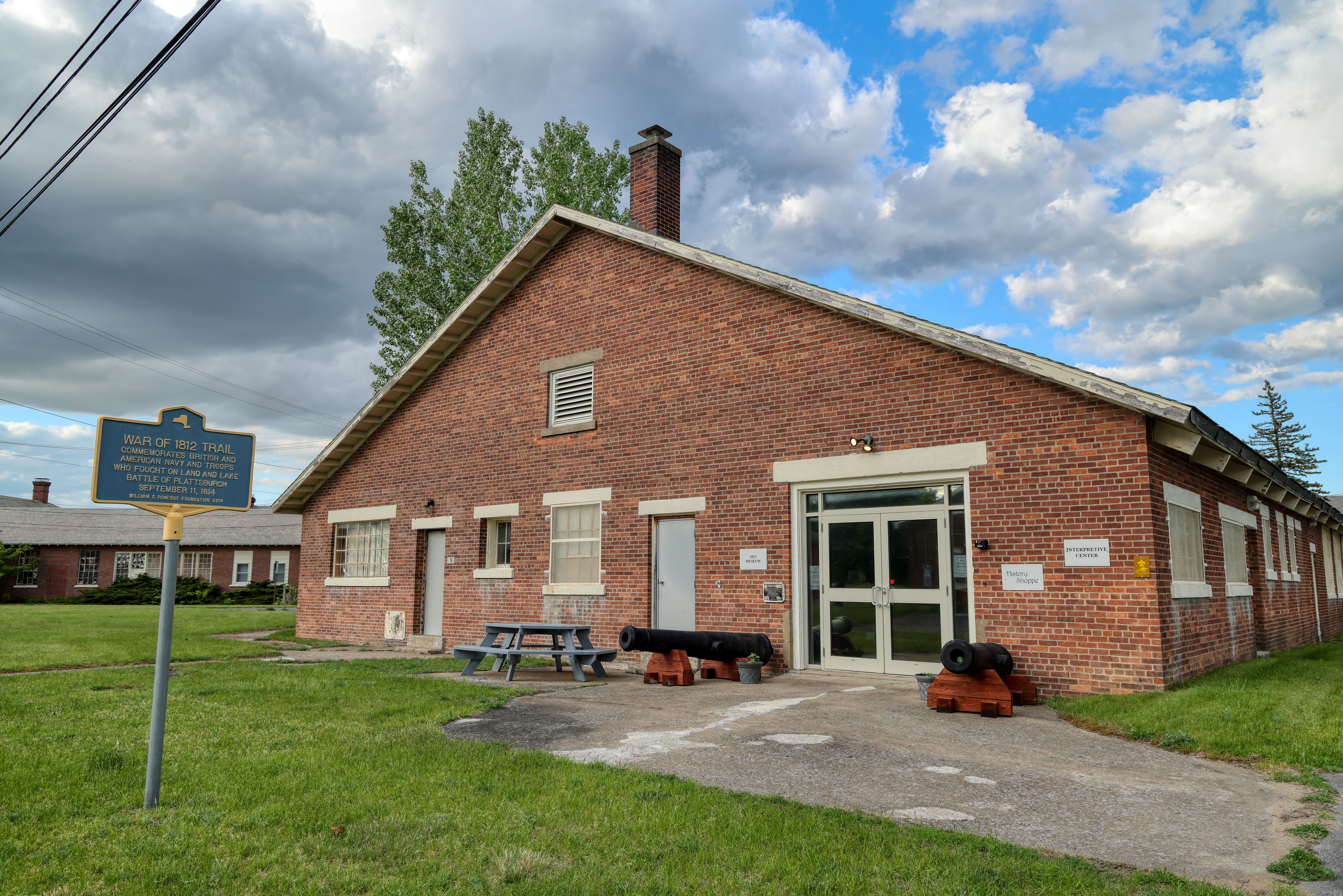
War of 1812 Museum in Plattsburgh, New York.

The War of 1812 Museum is a museum in Plattsburgh, New York dedicated to exploring the causes and effects of the War of 1812 and the Battle of Plattsburgh. The museum is run by the Battle of Plattsburgh Association and is located on the Plattsburgh Air Force Base.

The building has an interpretive center that features artifacts and graphic panels centered on a diorama depicting the battle. It also contains an exhibition area with rotating exhibits about the War of 1812. The museum hosts the Key Bank Gallery, which contains the paintings "Close Action" by Dean Mosher, and "Battle of Lake Champlain" by Julian Oliver Davidson. The museum is the caretaker of the original bronze plaques from the "Soldiers and Sailors Monument" on nearby Crab Island which are also on display in the gallery and were re-dedicated there in 2006. Group tours are available by appointment. A gift shop sells War of 1812 related items.

A historic marker entitled "War of 1812 Trail" was created by the and installed on the museum grounds in 2014. It was erected by the William G. Pomeroy Foundation and commemorates the members of the American and British military who fought during the Battle of Plattsburgh. As of September 2023, the museum is looking for a new location because it is "outgrowing its space."
