= Marietta Johnson School of Organic Education =

- School of Organic Education
- U.S. National Register of Historic Places
- Location within Alabama Location within the United States
- Location: Bounded by Fairhope and Morphy Aves. and Bancroft and School Sts., Fairhope, Alabama
- Coordinates: 30.52235°N 87.90121°W
- Area: 10 acres (4.0 ha)
- Built: 1904
- MPS: Fairhope MRA
- NRHP reference No.: 88001010
- Added to NRHP: July 1, 1988

The Marietta Johnson School of Organic Education was a school in Fairhope, Alabama, United States, founded by Marietta Johnson.

The School of Organic Education facility was listed on the National Register of Historic Places in 1988.

The listing included three contributing buildings: the Bell Building built and expanded in 1904 and 1910; Dahlgren Hall, built in 1912; and the Art Barn, built in 1924.

The school was profiled by educator John Dewey in his 1913 book Schools of Tomorrow.

The campus was sold to Faulkner State College sometime during or before 1987.
