= Wharton Esherick =

American sculptor, woodworker (1887–1970)

- Born: July 15, 1887; Philadelphia, Pennsylvania, US
- Died: May 6, 1970 (aged 82); Paoli, Pennsylvania, US
- Monuments: Wharton Esherick Museum
- Occupations: Sculptor, woodworker, painter, architect, interior designer
- Relatives: Joseph Esherick (nephew)

Pennsylvania Historical Marker
- Official name: Wharton Esherick (1887-1970)
- Designated: September 09, 2018
- Marker Location: Horseshoe Trail & Country Club Rd., Phoenixville

Wharton Esherick, Music Stand, cherrywood, 1962, Metropolitan Museum of Art

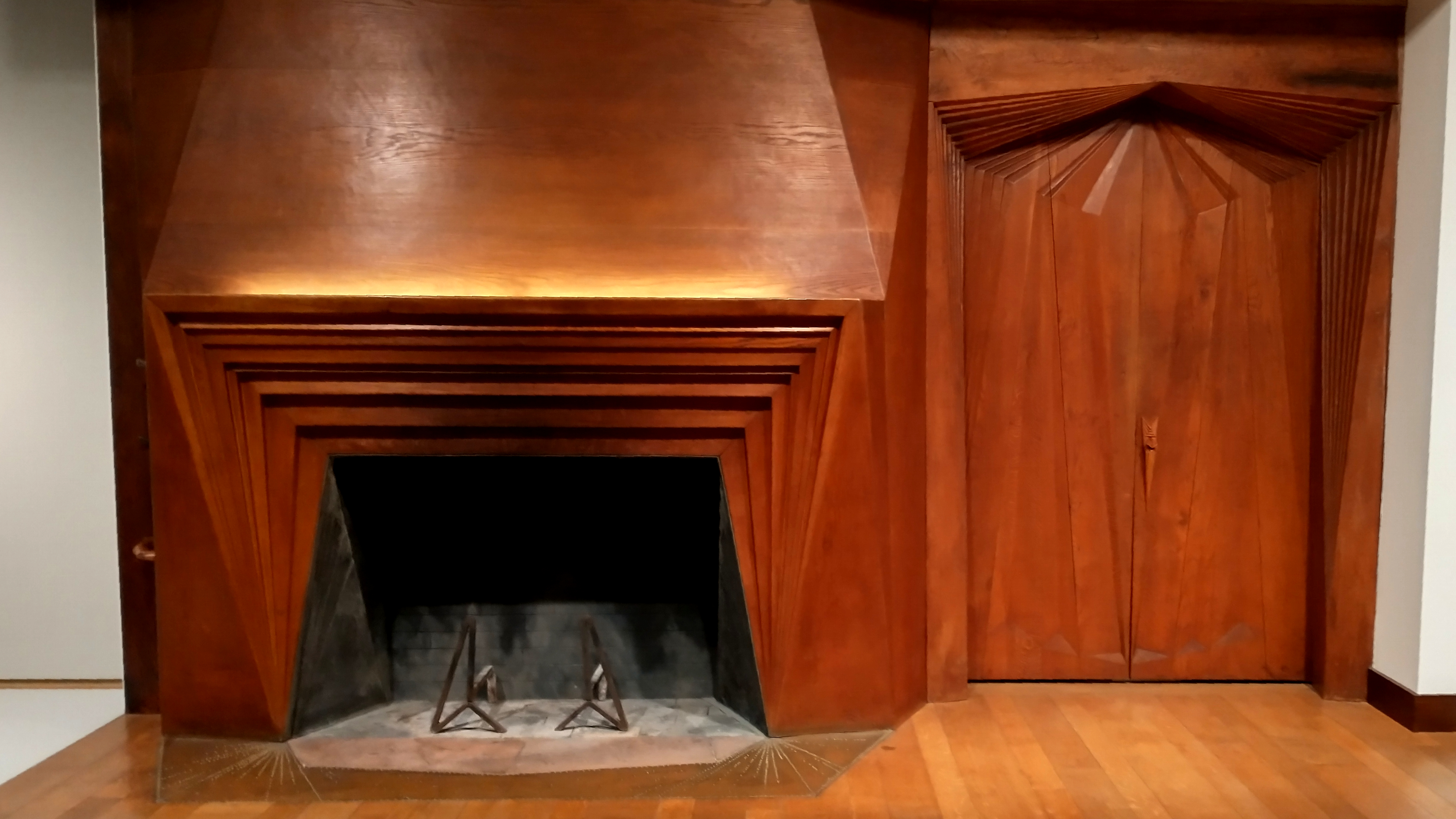
Wharton Esherick, Fireplace, andirons, and doorway from the Curtis Bok House, 1935–1938, Philadelphia Museum of Art

Esherick's woodblock print for Song of the Broad-Axe by Walt Whitman, 1924

Wharton Esherick (July 15, 1887 – May 6, 1970) was an American artist and designer. An artistic polymath, he worked in a wide variety of art media including painting, printmaking, and sculpture. His design works range from architectural interiors to handheld, tactile objects like light pulls and chess pieces. Esherick is best known for his wood furniture, which synthesizes modernist sculptural form with functional craft. His influence was keenly felt within the genre of Postwar studio craft, where he has been called the “father of studio furniture” and the “dean of American craftsmen.” The sculptor and furniture designer Wendell Castle cited Esherick as a formative influence. Castle credited Esherick with demonstrating that "furniture could be a form of sculpture," the "inherent tree characteristics in the utilization of wood," and the "importance of the entire sculptural environment."

The most comprehensive realization of Esherick's vision for a sculptural environment is his home and workplace, the Wharton Esherick Studio on Valley Forge Mountain in Malvern, Pennsylvania. The Studio is a total work of art, or Gesamtkunstwerk, in which hand crafted design elements large and small unite to form a totality. The building is preserved as the centerpiece of the Wharton Esherick Museum, which opened in 1972. It was designated a National Historic Landmark in 1993.

== Life and career ==
Wharton Esherick was born on July 15, 1887, in Philadelphia. He studied painting at the Pennsylvania Museum and School of Industrial Art (later the University of the Arts); and at the Pennsylvania Academy of the Fine Arts, however he left in 1910 and did not graduate.

In 1912, he married Leticia (Letty) Nofer (1892–1975), a dancer, weaver, and progressive educator. In 1913, the couple settled in a farmhouse on Valley Forge Mountain, twenty-five miles northwest of Philadelphia. There, they adopted a back-to-the-land lifestyle, growing their own food and making their own clothing. Letty raised their children in accordance with the holistic ideals of progressive education. All the while, Wharton tried to establish a career as a painter, but only sold a very few of his impressionist canvases.

Wharton Esherick had a career turning point in winter of 1919-1920. Letty, having attended a lecture by progressive educator Marietta Johnson, led the family to Fairhope, Alabama, where she taught at the Marietta Johnson School of Organic Education for one semester. The school had a manual training workshop. There, Wharton used borrowed tools for his first sustained effort in woodcarving: a series of decoratively carved frames for his paintings. Soon after returning to Pennsylvania, he began finding his way as a woodworker using various media: woodblock prints, furniture design, and sculpture.

Esherick’s early furniture was derived from the Arts and Crafts style and decorated with surface carving. In the late 1920s he abandoned carving on his furniture, focusing instead on the pure form of the pieces as sculpture. In the 1930s he was producing sculpture and furniture influenced by the organicism of Rudolf Steiner, as well as by German Expressionism and Cubism. The angular and prismatic forms of the latter two movements gave way to the free-form curvilinear shapes for which he is best known. His work was also part of the painting event in the art competition at the 1932 Summer Olympics.

From furniture and furnishings he progressed to interiors, the most famous being the Curtis Bok House (1935–37). Though the house was demolished in 1989, Esherick’s work was saved and the fireplace and adjacent music room doors can be seen in the Philadelphia Museum of Art, and the foyer stairs in the Wolfsonian Museum in Miami, Florida.

In 1940 the architect George Howe used Esherick’s Spiral Stair (1930) and Esherick furniture to create the “Pennsylvania Hill House” exhibit in the New York World’s Fair “America at Home” Pavilion. Esherick’s work was featured in a 1958 retrospective at the Museum of Contemporary Craft and in the 1972 “Woodenworks” exhibition at the Renwick Gallery. He exhibited hundreds of times during his life, and his work is in the permanent collections of the Philadelphia Museum of Art, the Pennsylvania Academy of the Fine Arts, the Metropolitan Museum of Art, the Whitney Museum, the Museum of Fine Arts of Boston, and many other museums and galleries. Most of his work remains in private hands.

The Diamond Rock Schoolhouse, which served as Esherick's painting studio during the 1920s, was acquired by the Wharton Esherick Museum in 2019.

Esherick was the father of Ruth Bascom (wife of architect Mansfield Bascom, curator emeritus of the Wharton Esherick Museum). He was the uncle of American architect Joseph Esherick.

== See also ==
- Margaret Esherick House, with a kitchen designed by Wharton Esherick
- Wharton Esherick Museum
