= Diamond Rock Schoolhouse =

Historic one-room schoolhouse in Pennsylvania, US

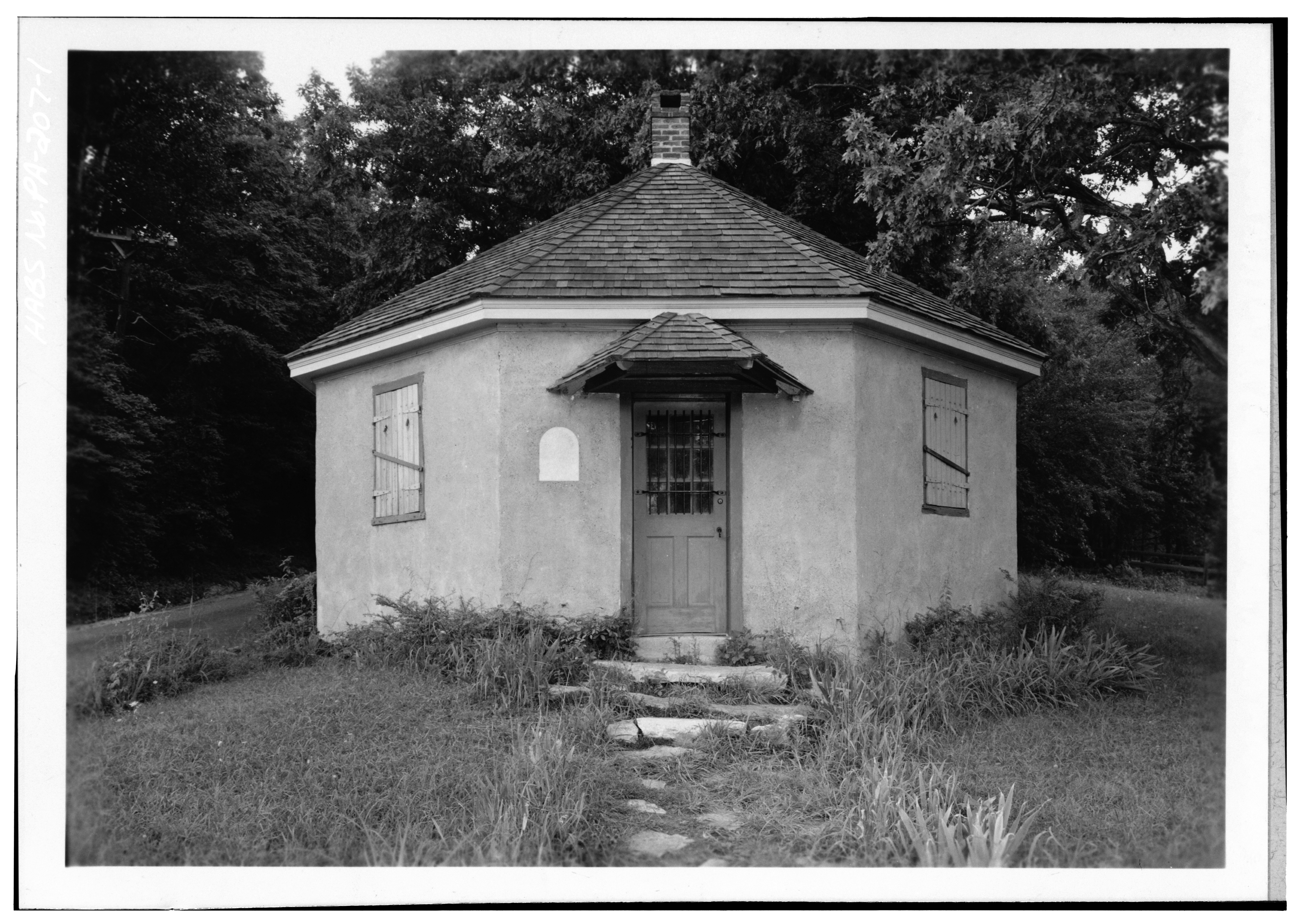
- Diamond Rock Schoolhouse in 1958 (photograph by Ned Goode)

General information
- Type: One-room schoolhouse
- Location: Intersection of Yellow Springs Road and Diamond Rock Road
- Town or city: Tredyffrin Township, Chester County, Pennsylvania
- Country: United States
- Coordinates: 40.0776064°N 75.4957504°W
- Completed: 1818
- Cost: $260.93
- Owner: Wharton Esherick Museum

Design and construction
- Architect(s): George Beaver

The Diamond Rock Schoolhouse is a historic octagonal one-room school located in Tredyffrin Township, Chester County, Pennsylvania. Constructed in 1818, the schoolhouse closed in 1864 and later served as a studio for Wharton Esherick. A local newspapers in 1940 described the schoolhouse as "one of the few remaining octagonal school buildings in Pennsylvania."

== Description and history ==
Constructed in 1818 at a cost of $260.93 by predominantly Mennonite families of Welsh and German descent, the schoolhouse was designed as an octagon because the shape provided one wall and window for each of the six grades and another for the teacher facing the door, with a wood-burning stove in the center of the room. This design could accommodate 60 students at a time. The schoolhouse is twenty-six feet across at its widest point, and each of its eight walls is ten feet long.

The schoolhouse closed in 1864 and reverted to the ownership of a local family. It fell into extreme disrepair until former pupils led by Emma Wersler (a member of the family that owned the property) banded together to restore and reopen the building in 1918. It served as Wharton Esherick's painting studio for four years during the 1920s and hosted meetings of the local 4H Club and other groups during the 1940s. The Wharton Esherick Museum has managed the property since 2019.

The schoolhouse was reportedly visited by Abraham Lincoln in the 1860s.
