= Margaret Esherick House =

Coordinates: 40.072362°N 75.206372°W

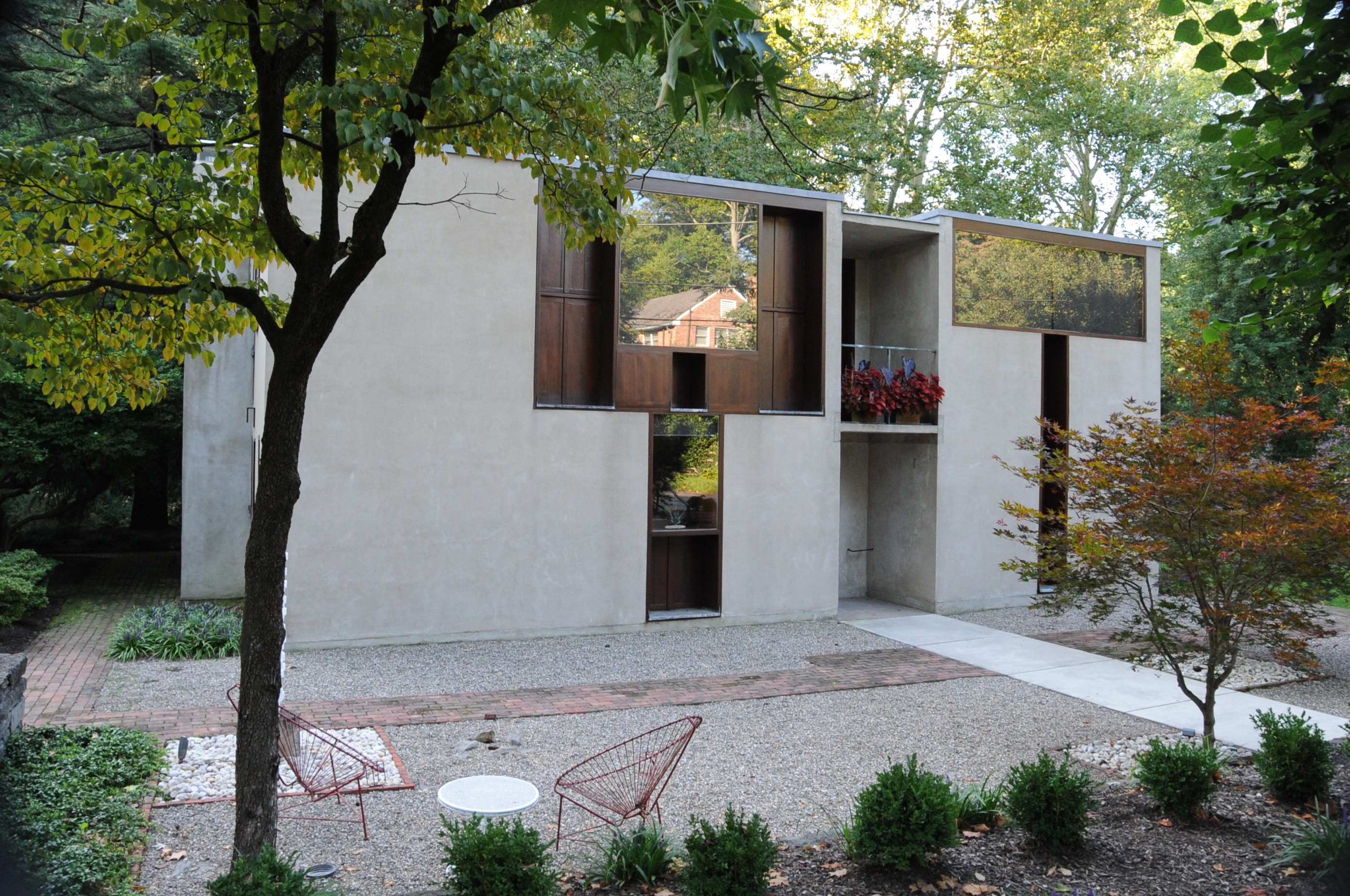
- Front elevation from Sunrise Lane (2023)

General information
- Status: Occupied
- Type: Residential
- Architectural style: Modern
- Location: 204 Sunrise Lane, Philadelphia
- Estimated completion: 1961
- Client: Margaret Esherick

Technical details
- Structural system: Load bearing
- Material: Concrete Masonry Unit
- Floor count: 2
- Floor area: 230 sq m

Design and construction
- Architect: Louis Kahn

Other information
- Parking: 1

The Margaret Esherick House in Philadelphia is one of the most studied of the nine built houses designed by American architect Louis Kahn. Commissioned by Chestnut Hill bookstore owner Margaret Esherick, the house was completed in 1961. In 2023, the house was listed on the National Register of Historic Places by the United States Department of the Interior.

The house is noted especially for its spatial organization and for the ventilation and natural lighting provided by its unusual window and shutter configuration. A sunken bathtub doubled as a seat. A kitchen of wood and copper was created for the house by Wharton Esherick, a nationally known craftsman and artist.

== Building details ==
Located at 204 Sunrise Lane in the Chestnut Hill neighborhood of Philadelphia, the Esherick House was commissioned by Margaret Esherick in 1959 and completed in 1961. Its copper and wood kitchen was created by Wharton Esherick, a nationally known craftsman and artist who was also her uncle. The Esherick House received the Landmark Building Award from the Philadelphia chapter of the American Institute of Architects in 1992 and was added to the Philadelphia Register of Historic Places in 2009. The house was inducted into the Chestnut Hill Architectural Hall of Fame in 2015. The 2500 sq feet (230 sq m), single-bedroom house is a flat-roofed, rectangular solid with its long side facing the street. The primary building material is concrete block with stucco facing.

Kahn designed an addition to the house in 1962-1964 for a prospective owner, Mrs. C. Parker, but she did not purchase the house and the addition was never built. Designed to blend seamlessly with the existing house, the proposed addition would have increased the house's size significantly by extending the house to the left as one faces the front door.

=== Spatial organization ===
Kahn often divided his buildings into what he called served spaces (primary areas) and servant spaces (corridors, bathrooms, etc.) The Esherick house is organized into four alternating served and servant spaces, which in this case are parallel two-story strips that run the full width of the house between front to back.

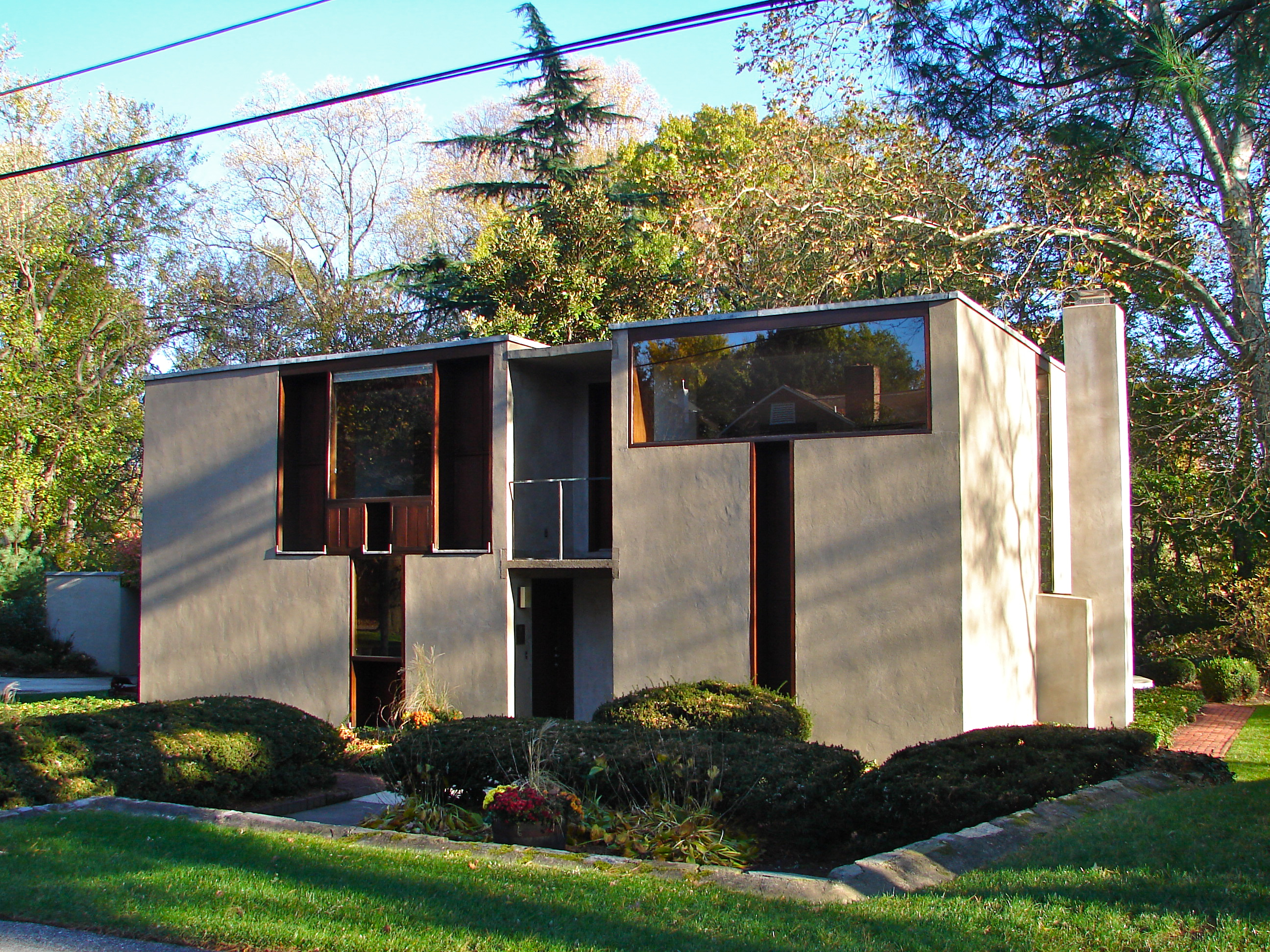
Front of the house (2010)

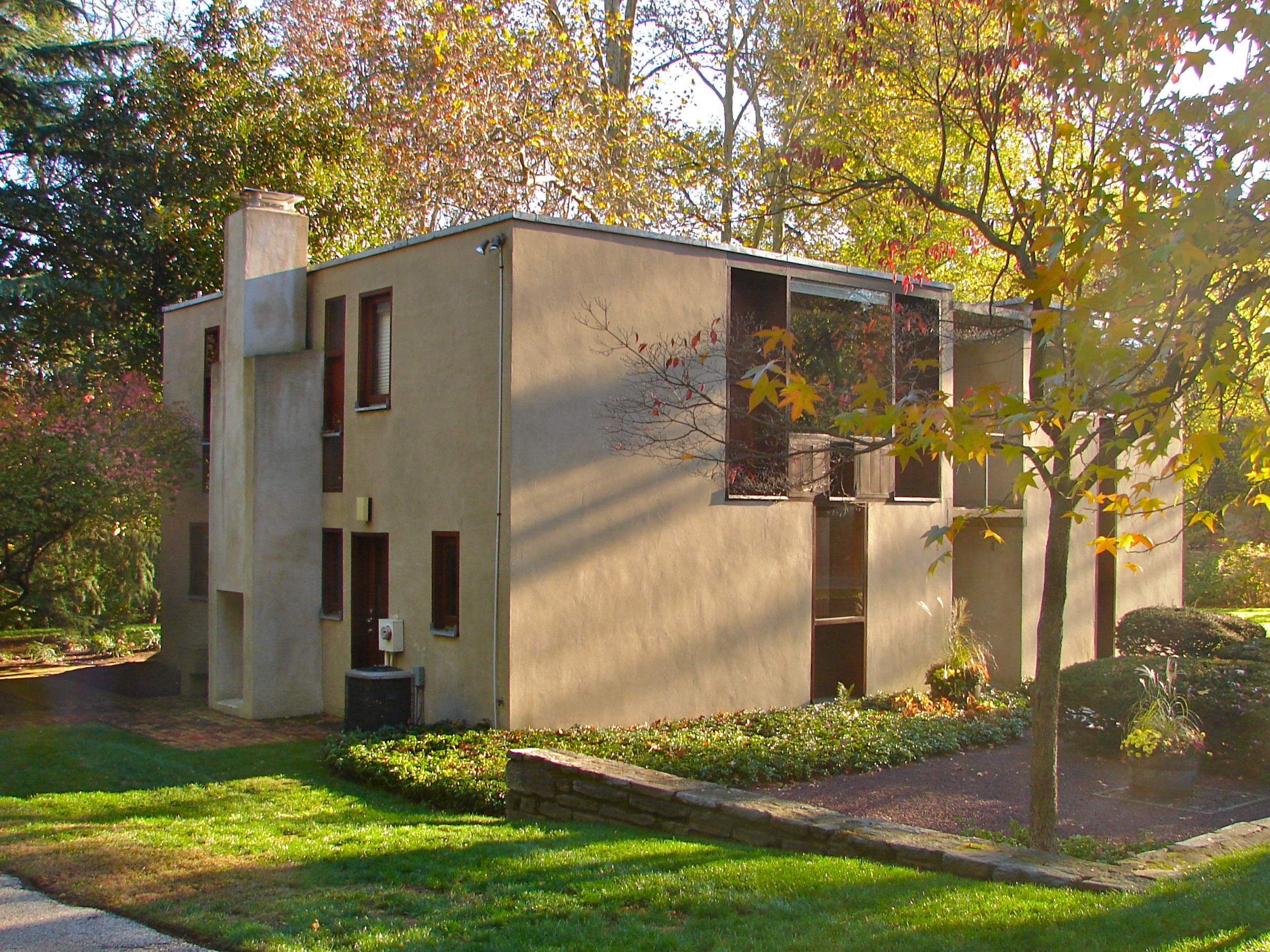
Front of house at right; kitchen side at left (2010)

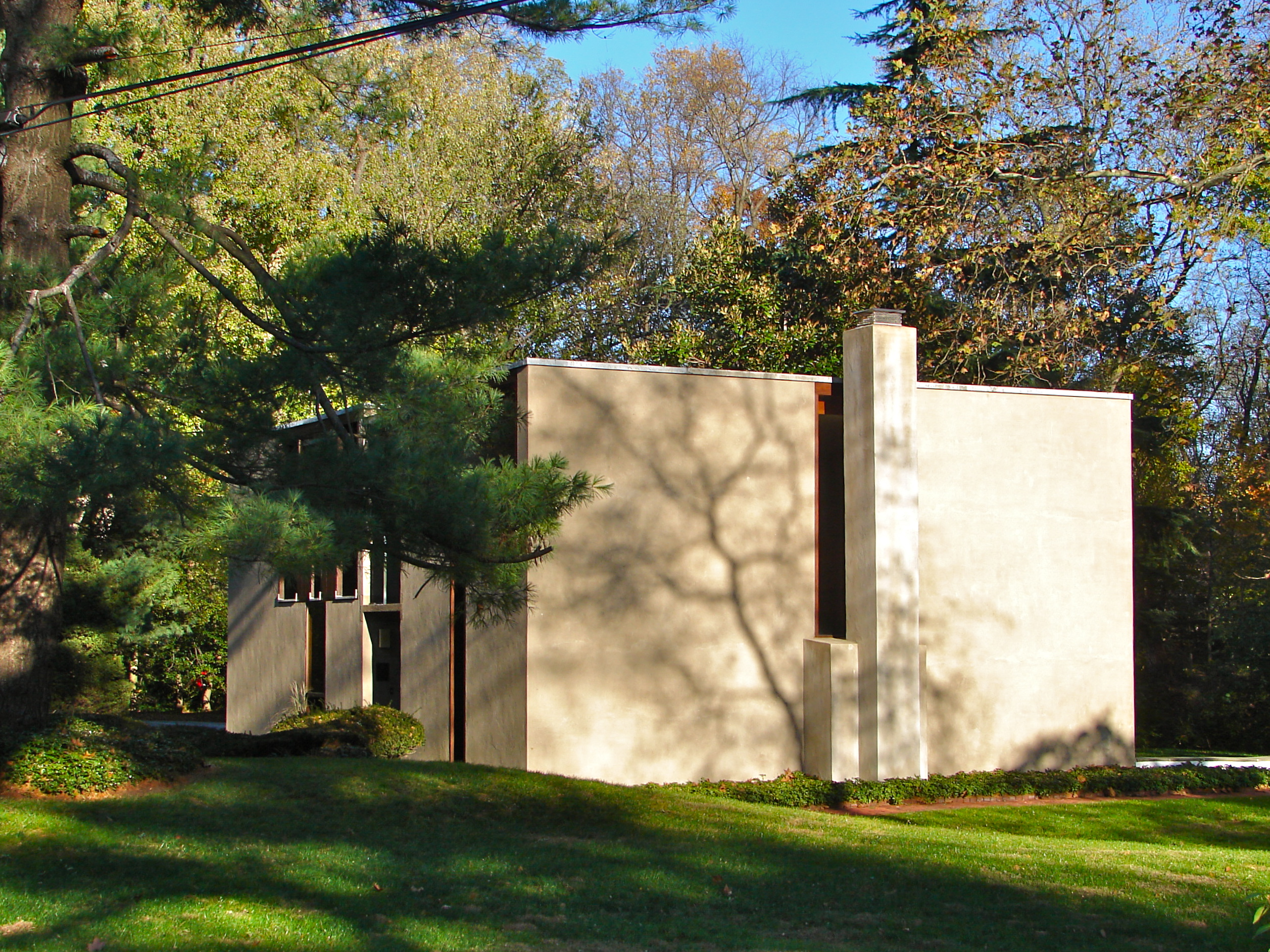
Front of house at left; Living room at right (2010)

The most prominent served space is the two-story living room that occupies all of the house to the right of the front door. Most of its front wall is occupied by a built-in bookcase (Margaret Esherick was a bookseller) that reaches up to the horizontal window at the second story. The side wall contains a deep fireplace.

The adjacent servant space is a thin communication strip that contains the front and back doors plus the two balconies above them, all of which are set in alcoves. This strip also contains the house's stairway and a gallery at the top of the stairs that overlooks the living room.

To the left of the front door is a served space occupied by the foyer and dining room on the ground floor and the bedroom on the upper floor. Like the living room, the bedroom runs the full width of the house from front to rear.

At the far left of the house is the remaining servant space, occupied on the ground floor by the Wharton Esherick designed kitchen, a utility room converted into an adjunctive kitchen space and a half bath, and on the upper floor by a bathroom, laundry area and closets. All the plumbing of the house is in this strip. On the upper floor, the bathtub is located not in the area with the toilet but in an adjoining area that contains a fireplace. The bathtub has a sliding wooden cover that can be pulled over it to convert it into a seating area beside the fireplace.

=== Windows and shutters ===
Each side of the house has a window and ventilation configuration that is distinctly different from that of the other three sides.

The two-story windows in front have a T shape that also appears in other Kahn designs, notably the Tribune Review Publishing Company Building; these windows provide a degree of privacy on the ground floor and openness on the upper floor. They cannot be opened, but they are accompanied by shutters for ventilation. In the living room, for example, the bookshelf at the front is divided in half by two narrow wooden shutters, one atop the other. Because there is no glass behind the shutters, they are kept closed in winter, creating a high wall that provides a sense of protection against the weather.

The side wall of the house to the right of the front door, the side with the living room, has a single tall, thin window above the fireplace that frames the chimney, which stands apart from the house itself. The window, which is not much wider than the chimney, permits only narrow glimpses through it. This window cannot be opened, and there are no shutters on this side of the house.

The side wall to the left of the front door, the side with the kitchen downstairs and bathroom space upstairs, has a variety of small windows that can be opened for ventilation.

The rear of the house faces a garden adjacent to a wooded public park. It has four large single-pane windows arranged in pairs, one window directly above the other, one window per floor. One pair serves the two-story living room and the other serves the space with the dining room downstairs and the bedroom upstairs. Each pair creates a nearly uninterrupted expanse of glass reaching from the bottom of the house to the top. These windows cannot be opened. They are provided with cloth roll shades for protection against the sun.

On both sides of each pair of these large windows are two-story stacks of shutters, four shutters per stack. They also reach from the bottom of the house to the top, and they can be opened and closed in any combination, creating an elaborate set of possible connections between indoors and outdoors. With the shutters open, the living and dining rooms have a completely open view into the back yard, and when all of the shutters and doors at the back of the house are open, most of the back wall seems to disappear.

The insides of both the front and rear walls of the living room, dining room and bedroom are lined with bookshelves and other structures that create an effective wall thickness of over two feet (60 cm). The resulting deep window recesses have a moderating effect on sunlight and ventilation.

== Kahn connections ==
Architect Louis Kahn had several connections with the Esherick family. Besides designing this house for Margaret Esherick, he was a close friend of Wharton Esherick, Margaret's uncle, for whom he designed a studio that is now part of a National Historic Landmark. Joseph Esherick, Margaret's brother, was a leader of the architectural firm that completed Kahn's schematic design for the Graduate Theological Union Library, now known as the Flora Lamson Hewlett Library, at the University of California, Berkeley, after Kahn's death.

Kahn also had connections to other notable architecture nearby. A few doors from the Esherick house is the Vanna Venturi House, one of the first prominent works of postmodern architecture, which was designed by Robert Venturi for his mother. Kahn served as a critic on Venturi's thesis, made him a teaching assistant at the University of Pennsylvania, where Kahn was a professor, and employed him in his architectural practice before Venturi began working independently.

== Renovation ==
A renovation of the Esherick House in 2016 was recognized by three awards: Preservation Achievement Awards from the Chestnut Hill Conservancy & Historical Society and the Preservation Alliance for Greater Philadelphia, and a Citation of Merit from Docomomo, an international organization that works to protect modern architecture. During the renovation, the kitchen was updated by installing modern appliances in the adjacent utility room, and the insulating ability of the building's windows was increased while retaining the look of the wooden shutter system. The renovation was carried out by k YODER design in collaboration with people who were knowledgeable of the work of Louis Kahn and Wharton Esherick. Louise Cohen, NCIDQ, ASID coordinated the interior decoration in conjunction with the residence's owners.

== See also ==
- Vanna Venturi House
- Wharton Esherick Studio
