= Xanti Schawinsky =

Swiss artist

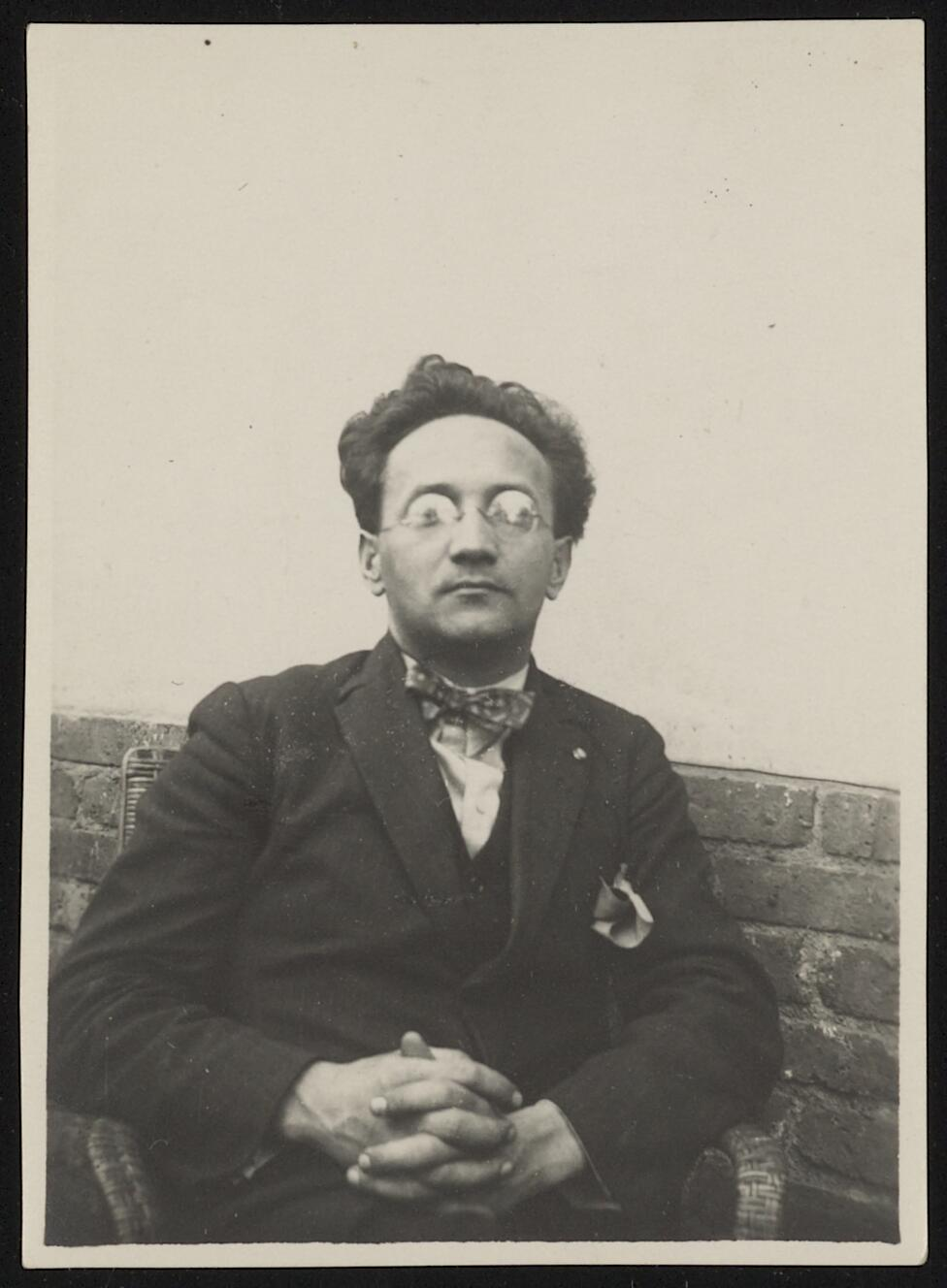
Xanti Schawinsky (ca.1925) (Photo by Theo van Doesburg)

Alexander Schawinsky, known as Xanti Schawinsky (March 25, 1904 – September 11, 1979) was a Swiss painter, photographer and theatre designer. An alumnus of the Bauhaus, Schawinsky belonged to Bauhaus founder and architect Walter Gropius' social circle.

== Early life ==
Shawinsky was born March 25, 1904, in Basel, the second child of Benjamin Schawinsky and Regina Bielawska, both of Polish-Jewish descent. Schawinsky attended school in Basel from 1910 to 1914, and then high school in Zurich from 1915 to 1921. He apprenticed at the architecture office of Theodor Merill in Cologne until 1923. After visiting the Berlin School of Applied Arts for a short time in 1923, Schawinsky enrolled in the Bauhaus in Weimar in 1924. Paul Klee, Wassily Kandinsky, Adolf Meyer and László Moholy-Nagy were among his teachers. In the stage department led by Oskar Schlemmer Schawinsky developed skits and pantomimes, and created his first stage work.

== After Bauhaus ==
With the closure of the Weimar Bauhaus in 1925, Schawinsky moved to Bauhaus Dessau, focusing on experimental photography. At the Bauhaus he played saxophone in the student band. From 1926 to 1927 he designed stage sets in Zwickau, and taught as an assistant to Schlemmer in stage design at Bauhaus. Schawinsky also began to devote himself to painting. In 1927 he exhibited at Deutsche Theaterausstellung in Magdeburg.

Schawinsky was close friends with Herbert Bayer and Marcel Breuer and was godfather of Julia Bayer, the 1929-born daughter of Herbert and Irene Bayer.

In 1929 Schawinsky went to Magdeburg, hired by Johannes Göderitz to head the graphic department of the municipal building authority. During this time he became picture editor of the theatre newspaper Das Stichwort. Due to political and Antisemitic hostility, Schawinsky left Magdeburg at the end of 1931 and moved to Berlin as a freelance artist. With the rise of Hitler and the Nazi party, Schawinsky emigrated to Italy, where he resumed painting in Rapallo. Working at Olivetti he co-designed a new semi-professional typewriter, the Olivetti Studio 42. Schawinsky also consulted for architects Fingini & Pollini on the design, who at the time built the new headquarters for Olivetti.

== Move to the US ==
Schawinsky was invited to Black Mountain College in the US in 1936 by Josef Albers and the Museum of Modern Art in New York exhibited his work. Schawinsky designed the North Carolina Pavilion at the 1939 New York World's Fair and, with Breuer and Gropius, the Pennsylvania Pavilion. In 1941 he moved to New York, teaching at the City College of New York from 1943 to 1946 and at New York University from 1950 to 1954.

From 1961 Schawinsky travelled for longer periods to Europe, building a second home in Oggebbio on Lake Maggiore and also exhibited in Germany. In 1971, the Museum of Modern Art presented a film about Schawinsky and his work in New York. In 1981, Hans Heinz Holz published a monograph.

In 1936, Schawinsky married Irene von Debschitz (1903-1990), the daughter of Wanda von Debschitz-Kunowski, and their son Ben was born in 1939. In 1963 he married Gisela Hatzky, and their son Daniel was born in 1973.

Schawinsky died on September 11, 1979, in Locarno, Switzerland.
