= Marietta Johnson =

American educational reformer and Georgist (1864–1938)

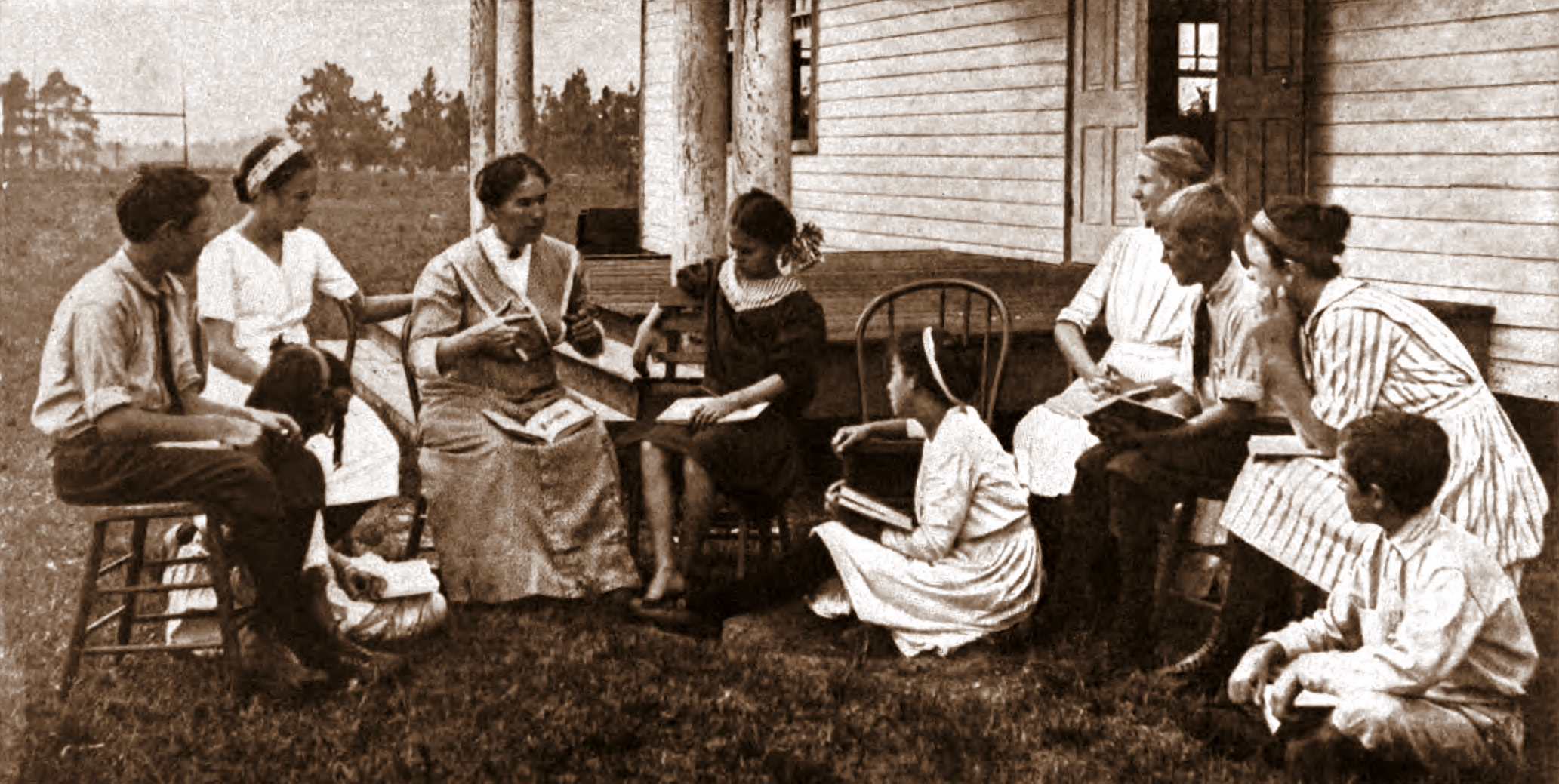
Marietta Johnson

Marietta Pierce Johnson (Oct. 8, 1864–Dec. 23,1938) was an American educational reformer and Georgist. Johnson was born in St. Paul, Minnesota, and moved with her family to Fairhope, Alabama, in 1902. In 1907, she founded a progressive school called the School of Organic Education (now the Marietta Johnson School of Organic Education).

== Career ==
Johnson had been a teacher in the regular school system in Minnesota and had radical ideas on education reform. She felt that children should live natural lives, study the outdoors and not be forced to read at too young an age.

In her "organic school", tests were not administered, homework was withheld until high school, and grades were unknown. She required hand crafts and folk dancing along with the traditional academic curriculum. Her school was a magnet to young teachers and to artists, and was instrumental in building the reputation of Fairhope as an artists' colony. Encouraged and funded by friends in the small experimental community of Fairhope, Alabama, Johnson began her revolutionary school on a ten-acre campus – teaching, writing, training teachers in her method. Her little school attracted national attention, and she was one of the founders of the Progressive Education Association.

Johnson was in great demand as a lecturer and, after John Dewey's favorable review of her school in 1915, she achieved worldwide recognition as a leader in the Progressive Education movement. She was responsible for the founding of many schools based upon her philosophy; however, her heart was in Fairhope, and her school there was the center of her activities. A speaker of great power, she was able to persuade audiences and educators of the validity of her philosophy, and her school attracted a number of intellectuals to Fairhope to enroll their children in The School of Organic Education. Johnson believed in classes without final examinations, homework, or failure.

== Legacy ==
The school reached its zenith in the 1920s, in part because of John Dewey's book and its reference to Johnson and her school. Through the great depression, two world wars and Johnson's death in 1938, the Organic School has never closed its doors and is still operating in Fairhope.

Three buildings of the school were listed on the National Register of Historic Places in 1988 as School of Organic Education.
