= Fairhope, Alabama =

- City
- Downtown Fairhope

- Flag Seal
- Motto: "You've arrived"
- Location in Baldwin County, Alabama
- Coordinates: 30°29′30″N 87°52′40″W
- Country: United States
- State: Alabama
- County: Baldwin
- Founded: November 15, 1894
- Incorporated: April 25, 1908

Government
  - Type: Mayor–council

Area
  - City: 14.53 sq mi (37.64 km^{2})
  - Land: 14.47 sq mi (37.49 km^{2})
  - Water: 0.054 sq mi (0.14 km^{2})
- Elevation: 115 ft (35 m)

Population (2020)
  - City: 22,477
  - Estimate (2022): 23,859
  - Density: 1,552.8/sq mi (599.53/km^{2})
  - Urban: 76,807
  - Metro: 246,435 (US: 194th)
- Time zone: UTC−6 (Central (CST))
  - Summer (DST): UTC−5 (CDT)
- ZIP codes: 36532-36533
- Area code: 251
- FIPS code: 01-25240
- GNIS feature ID: 2403590
- Sales tax: 9.0%
- Website: fairhopeal.gov

Fairhope is a city in Baldwin County, Alabama, United States, located on the eastern shoreline of Mobile Bay. The population was 22,477 at the 2020 census. Fairhope is a principal city of the Daphne-Fairhope-Foley metropolitan area, which includes all of Baldwin County.

== History ==
Fairhope was founded on November 15, 1894, on the site of the former Alabama City as a Georgist "Single-Tax" colony by the Fairhope Industrial Association, a group of 28 followers of economist Henry George who had incorporated earlier that year in Des Moines, Iowa. Their corporate constitution explained their purpose in founding a new colony:

to establish and conduct a model community or colony, free from all forms of private monopoly, and to secure to its members therein equality of opportunity, the full reward of individual efforts, and the benefits of co-operation in matters of general concern.

In forming their demonstration project, they pooled their funds to purchase land at "Stapleton's pasture" on the eastern shore of Mobile Bay and then divided it into a number of long-term leaseholds. The corporation paid all governmental taxes from rents paid by the lessees, thus simulating a single-tax. The purpose of the single-tax colony was to eliminate disincentives for productive use of land and thereby retain the value of land for the community.

"Fairhope Avenue" was one of the properties on the 1910 version of the board game The Landlord's Game, a precursor of Monopoly.

In 1907, educator Marietta Johnson founded the School for Organic Education in Fairhope. The school was praised in John Dewey's influential 1915 book Schools of Tomorrow. Dewey and Johnson were founding members of the Progressive Education Association.

Fairhope became a popular wintering spot for artists and intellectuals. Sherwood Anderson, Clarence Darrow, Wharton Esherick, Carl Zigrosser, and Upton Sinclair were among its notable visitors.

The Fairhope Single-Tax Corporation still operates, with 1,800 leaseholds covering more than 4,000 acres (16 km^{2}) in and around the current city of Fairhope. Despite the ideals of the corporation, the town has transitioned from utopian experiment to artists' and intellectuals' colony to boutique resort and affluent suburb of Mobile. White flight from nearby Mobile has caused the population of Baldwin County to almost triple since the 1940s, and particularly since desegregation, contributing to the mostly-White demographics of Daphne, Fairhope, and Spanish Fort.

In 2019 the New York Times termed Fairhope to be "A Southern Town That’s Been Holding On to Its Charm, for More Than a Century".

== Geography ==
Fairhope is located on the shore of Mobile Bay. It is located 6 miles (10 km) south of Daphne and 10 miles (16 km) south of Spanish Fort. U.S. Route 98 (Greeno Road) runs north–south through the city. It lies on a sloping plateau.

According to the United States Census Bureau, the city has a total area of 12.0 square miles (31.1 km^{2}), of which 0.019 square mile (0.05 km^{2}), or 0.16%, is water. Its elevation ranges from sea level at the bay to 122 feet (37 m) in the city center.

=== Climate ===
Fairhope has a humid subtropical climate. It experiences hot, humid summers and generally mild winters, with average temperatures ranging from 90 °F (32 °C) in the summer to 50.4 °F (10.2 °C) during winter.

Climate data for Fairhope, Alabama (1991–2020 normals, extremes 1893–present)
Month	Jan	Feb	Mar	Apr	May	Jun	Jul	Aug	Sep	Oct	Nov	Dec	Year
Record high °F (°C)	85 (29)	88 (31)	88 (31)	97 (36)	98 (37)	103 (39)	105 (41)	103 (39)	105 (41)	97 (36)	94 (34)	89 (32)	105 (41)
Mean maximum °F (°C)	76.0 (24.4)	77.5 (25.3)	82.2 (27.9)	85.7 (29.8)	92.1 (33.4)	95.0 (35.0)	96.6 (35.9)	95.9 (35.5)	93.9 (34.4)	89.7 (32.1)	83.0 (28.3)	78.0 (25.6)	97.5 (36.4)
Mean daily maximum °F (°C)	61.8 (16.6)	65.4 (18.6)	71.8 (22.1)	77.9 (25.5)	85.0 (29.4)	89.4 (31.9)	91.1 (32.8)	91.1 (32.8)	88.2 (31.2)	80.5 (26.9)	71.0 (21.7)	64.3 (17.9)	78.1 (25.6)
Daily mean °F (°C)	49.2 (9.6)	52.6 (11.4)	58.8 (14.9)	64.9 (18.3)	72.6 (22.6)	78.5 (25.8)	80.3 (26.8)	80.0 (26.7)	76.5 (24.7)	67.4 (19.7)	57.6 (14.2)	51.7 (10.9)	65.8 (18.8)
Mean daily minimum °F (°C)	36.6 (2.6)	39.8 (4.3)	45.9 (7.7)	51.9 (11.1)	60.3 (15.7)	67.5 (19.7)	69.6 (20.9)	69.0 (20.6)	64.7 (18.2)	54.3 (12.4)	44.2 (6.8)	39.1 (3.9)	53.6 (12.0)
Mean minimum °F (°C)	22.8 (−5.1)	27.0 (−2.8)	32.1 (0.1)	40.1 (4.5)	49.8 (9.9)	62.4 (16.9)	66.8 (19.3)	65.7 (18.7)	56.5 (13.6)	41.3 (5.2)	30.4 (−0.9)	27.2 (−2.7)	21.1 (−6.1)
Record low °F (°C)	5 (−15)	−3 (−19)	19 (−7)	29 (−2)	40 (4)	52 (11)	58 (14)	60 (16)	41 (5)	32 (0)	21 (−6)	8 (−13)	−3 (−19)
Average precipitation inches (mm)	5.48 (139)	4.65 (118)	5.06 (129)	5.51 (140)	4.93 (125)	6.78 (172)	9.03 (229)	7.16 (182)	6.60 (168)	4.38 (111)	4.57 (116)	5.16 (131)	69.31 (1,760)
Average precipitation days (≥ 0.01 in)	10.9	9.6	9.0	7.5	8.1	12.6	14.4	15.0	10.9	7.1	7.7	10.5	123.3
Source: NOAA

== Demographics ==
Historical population
Census	Pop.	Note	%±
1910	590		—
1920	853		44.6%
1930	1,549		81.6%
1940	1,845		19.1%
1950	3,354		81.8%
1960	4,858		44.8%
1970	5,720		17.7%
1980	7,299		27.6%
1990	8,485		16.2%
2000	12,480		47.1%
2010	15,326		22.8%
2020	22,477		46.7%
2025 (est.)	26,625	▲	18.5%
U.S. Decennial Census; 2020 Census

=== Racial and ethnic composition ===
Fairhope city, Alabama – Racial and ethnic composition Note: the US Census treats Hispanic/Latino as an ethnic category. This table excludes Latinos from the racial categories and assigns them to a separate category. Hispanics/Latinos may be of any race. Race and ethnicity was not surveyed for populations under 2,500 in the 1980 census and under 1,000 in 1990 census.
Race / Ethnicity (NH = Non-Hispanic)	Pop 1980	Pop 1990	Pop 2000	Pop 2010	Pop 2020	% 1980	% 1990	% 2000	% 2010	% 2020
White alone (NH)	6,566	7,775	11,176	13,689	19,456	89.96%	91.63%	89.55%	89.32%	86.56%
Black or African American alone (NH)	580	577	964	952	1,083	7.95%	6.80%	7.72%	6.21%	4.82%
Native American or Alaska Native alone (NH)	32	16	24	27	60	0.44%	0.19%	0.19%	0.18%	0.27%
Asian alone (NH)	0	26	77	106	203	0.00%	0.31%	0.62%	0.69%	0.90%
Native Hawaiian or Pacific Islander alone (NH)	x	x	4	7	20	x	x	0.03%	0.05%	0.09%
Other race alone (NH)	7	0	5	1	43	0.10%	0.00%	0.04%	0.01%	0.19%
Mixed race or Multiracial (NH)	x	x	100	112	748	x	x	0.80%	0.73%	3.33%
Hispanic or Latino (any race)	114	91	130	432	864	1.56%	1.07%	1.04%	2.82%	3.84%
Total	7,299	8,485	12,480	15,326	22,477	100.00%	100.00%	100.00%	100.00%	100.00%

=== 2020 census ===
As of the 2020 census, Fairhope had a population of 22,477 living in 9,297 households, of which 5,606 were family households. The median age was 48.9 years. 21.2% of residents were under the age of 18 and 29.1% of residents were 65 years of age or older. For every 100 females there were 85.6 males, and for every 100 females age 18 and over there were 81.1 males age 18 and over.

97.7% of residents lived in urban areas, while 2.3% lived in rural areas.

Of all households, 27.6% had children under the age of 18 living in them. 56.9% were married-couple households, 10.9% were households with a male householder and no spouse or partner present, and 29.1% were households with a female householder and no spouse or partner present. About 27.8% of all households were made up of individuals and 17.7% had someone living alone who was 65 years of age or older.

There were 10,197 housing units, of which 8.8% were vacant. The homeowner vacancy rate was 2.2% and the rental vacancy rate was 8.7%.

=== 2010 census ===
As of the census of 2010, there were 15,326 people, 6,732 households, and 4,395 families residing in the city. Its population density was 1,271 per square mile (491/km^{2}). There were 7,659 housing units at an average density of 634.5 per square mile (245.0/km^{2}). The racial makeup of the city was 91.1% White, 6.2% Black, 0.7% Asian, 0.2% Native American, 0.0% Pacific Islander, 0.9% from other races, and 0.8% from two or more races. 2.8% of the population were Hispanic or Latino of any race.

There were 6,732 households, out of which 25.9% had children under the age of 18 living with them, 53.6% were married couples living together, 9.1% had a female householder with no husband present, and 34.7% were non-families. 31.2% of all households were made up of individuals, and 17.1% had someone living alone who was 65 years of age or older. The average household size was 2.26 and the average family size was 2.84.

21.4% of the population was under the age of 18, 4.9% from 18 to 24, 20.4% from 25 to 44, 28.5% from 45 to 64, and 23.7% who were 65 years of age or older. The median age was 46 years. For every 100 females, there were 86.4 males. For every 100 females age 18 and over, there were 86.3 males. The median income for a household in the city was $66,157, and the median income for a family was $93,549. Males had a median income of $60,591 versus $36,218 for females. The per capita income for the city was $35,086. About 5.0% of families and 5.9% of the population were below the poverty line, including 9.8% of those under age 18 and 4.6% of those age 65 or over.

== Government ==
Fairhope is governed by a mayor and five-person city council which was last elected in 2025. The mayor serves as the full-time city executive, while council members serve part-time.

Mayor: Sherry Sullivan

=== Development ===
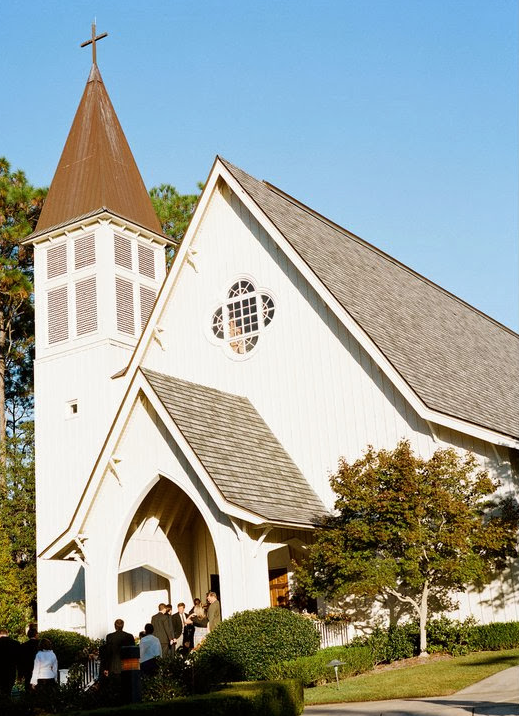
Episcopal Church in Fairhope

Local and national real estate developers have built commercial facilities in the downtown area that are larger than have been historically allowed. Fairhope's building and zoning ordinances overlap with those of Baldwin County.

== Education ==
Fairhope's public schools are part of the Baldwin County Public Schools system:

- Fairhope High School (9–12) – 1,575 students, Principal Jon Cardwell. Fairhope High School is located in the southernmost part of Fairhope. It is estimated that 39% of the city of Fairhope's high school age students attend Daphne High School that is north of Fairhope.
- Fairhope Middle School (7–8) – 802 students, Principal Angie Hall
- J. Larry Newton School (K–6) – 769 students, Principal Patrice Krueger, (Barnwell, Alabama)
- Fairhope West Elementary School (K-6) – 1,011 students, Principal
- Fairhope East Elementary School (K-6) – 725 students, Principal

Other schools in Fairhope include:

- The Marietta Johnson School of Organic Education – continues to operate as a private school with 19 students as of 2023. The school offers education to life groups that traditionally span 1st through 8th grades.
- St. Michael Catholic High School – beginning in 2016 with grades 9–12, adding a grade each year thereafter for a total enrollment 356
- Bayshore Christian School – beginning in 2002 with Kindergarten, adding a grade each year thereafter, currently offering PreK-12th grade for a total enrollment 435
- Faulkner State Community College – has a campus in Fairhope that provides adult education, undergraduate courses, non-credit and community service programs
- The University of South Alabama – has a branch campus in Fairhope providing graduate and upper-level undergraduate courses in education, counseling, nursing and business alongside non-credit and community service programs

== Transportation ==
Countywide dial-a-ride transit service is provided by BRATS, the Baldwin Regional Area Transit System.

== Notable people ==
- Pinky Bass, photographer
- Bob Baumhower, football player and businessman
- Rick Bragg, writer
- Jimmy Buffett, singer and songwriter
- Bradley Byrne, former U.S. Congressman from the 1st District of Alabama
- Grayson Capps, singer songwriter
- Eugenia S. Chapman, educator and Illinois state representative
- Dave Edwards, musician
- Grant Enfinger, professional race car driver
- Fannie Flagg (Patricia Neal), author and actress
- Abbi Glines, writer
- Winston Groom, novelist (Forrest Gump)
- Fred Nall Hollis (Nall), artist
- Marie Howland, 19th century utopian and journalist
- Marietta Johnson, educator and reformer
- David King, former NFL defensive back
- Riley Leonard, NFL quarterback
- Leon Lett, football player
- Dean Mosher, artist, author and historian
- George M. Murray, bishop in the Episcopal Church
- Burton Ritchie, entrepreneur
- Philip Rivers, former NFL quarterback
- Janie Shores, Alabama Supreme Court justice
- Anis Shorrosh (1933–2018), Palestinian Evangelical Christian author, speaker, and pastor
- Eddie Stanky, former Major League Baseball player and manager
- Dave Stapleton, former baseball player
- Thompson Square, country music duo
- Bill Varney, film sound editor
- Bob Weltlich, former college basketball coach

== See also ==
- Eastern Shore (Alabama)
- National Register of Historic Places listings in Baldwin County, Alabama, including several Fairhope districts and properties
