= Wharton Esherick Museum =

- The Wharton Esherick Museum, 2018.
- Interactive map of Wharton Esherick Museum
- 40°5′1″N 75°29′36″W
- Location: Malvern, Chester County, Pennsylvania, U.S.

History
- Built: 1926-1966

Site notes
- Area: 12 acres (4.9 ha)
- Architect(s): Wharton Esherick; Louis Kahn; Anne Tyng
- Architectural styles: Arts and Crafts, modernism, expressionism
- Visitors: about 5,500
- Wharton Esherick Studio
- U.S. National Register of Historic Places
- U.S. National Historic Landmark
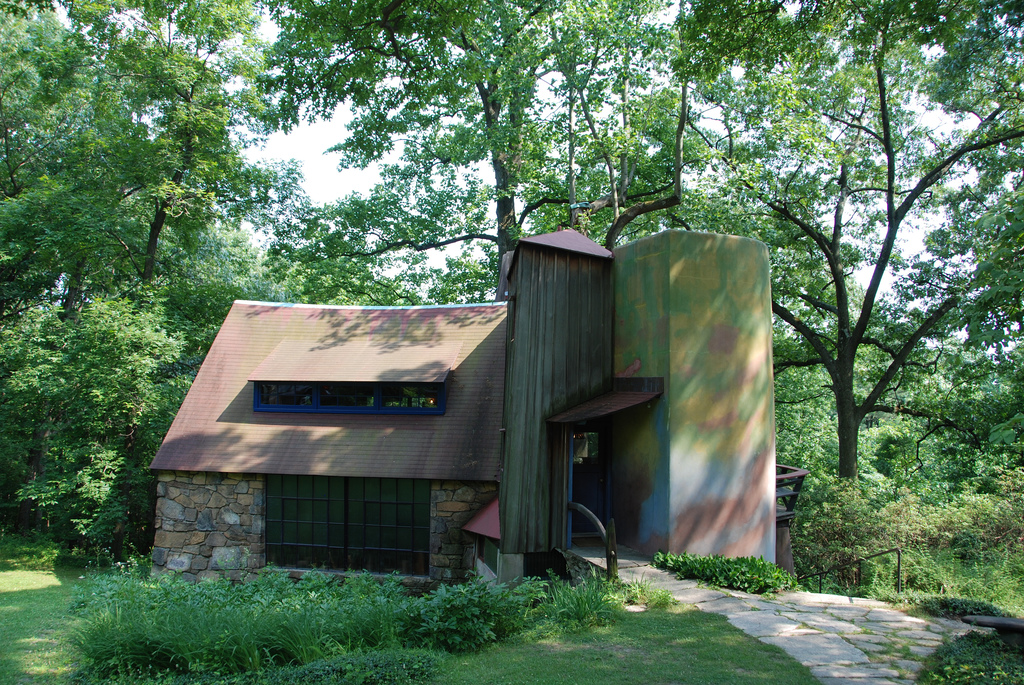
- Wharton Esherick Studio

- Location within Pennsylvania Location within the United States
- Location: 1520 Horseshoe Trail, near Malvern, Tredyffrin Township, Pennsylvania
- Area: 12 acres (4.9 ha)
- Built: 1926–1966
- Architect: Wharton Esherick
- Architectural style: Arts and Crafts, vernacular architecture, expressionism, modernism
- NRHP reference No.: 73001615

Significant dates
- Added to NRHP: April 26, 1973
- Designated NHL: April 19, 1993

The Wharton Esherick Museum is the home and workshop of Wharton Esherick (1887–1970), an American artist and designer. Though Esherick worked in a wide range of art media, he is best known for his wood furniture, which married modernist sculptural form with functional craft. The Museum is located on the south slope of Valley Forge Mountain in Malvern, Pennsylvania, twenty-five miles northwest of Philadelphia. It is the most fully realized expression of Esherick's vision for integrating art into the spaces of everyday life.

There are four historic structures on the Wharton Esherick Museum site: the Wharton Esherick Studio, where Esherick lived and worked; the 1956 workshop designed with Louis Kahn and Anne Tyng; the 1928 German Expressionist log garage which now serves as the museum visitor center; and Esherick's woodshed. There is also a recent reconstruction of Esherick's 1920s German Expressionist outhouse.

== Campus ==
The Museum has four historic structures that were designed and built by Esherick and his collaborators. The Wharton Esherick Studio (1926–66) is a hand crafted, sculptural building that Esherick created over forty years. the Studio showcases Esherick's broad interests in art and design. The building combines elements of rural, vernacular architecture with modernist sculptural forms and painterly surfaces. The Studio, from its structural forms down to the door handles and light pulls, was designed and built by Wharton Esherick to create a total work of art, or Gesamtkunstwerk. The building is filled with more than 300 of Wharton Esherick's artworks and personal belongings, including sculpture, furniture, paintings and prints.

The Workshop (1955–56), built as an annex to the Studio, was designed by architects Louis Kahn and Anne Tyng in collaboration with Esherick. Other historic buildings at the Museum include Esherick's expressionist log cabin garage (1928) and his woodshed. There is also a replica of an expressionist outhouse that Esherick created, taking his inspiration from the set design for the 1920 horror film, The Cabinet of Dr. Caligari.

The Wharton Esherick Studio has been on the United States National Register of Historic Places since 1973. In 1993, The United States Department of the Interior designated the Wharton Esherick Museum a National Historic Landmark. This latter designation encompasses the Studio, 1956 Workshop, Esherick's garage and woodshed, and remnants of an outhouse. The Museum is a member of the Historic Artists' Homes and Studios network of the National Trust for Historic Preservation.

The Wharton Esherick Museum campus also includes the 19th-century farmhouse where Esherick lived with his family, and the Diamond Rock Schoolhouse, which served as Esherick's painting studio from 1916 to 1920. The schoolhouse was acquired by the Wharton Esherick Museum in 2019.

== History ==
Wharton Esherick moved to Valley Forge Mountain in 1913. As newlyweds, he and his wife, Leticia (Letty) Nofer Esherick settled in a farmhouse on the steep, south-facing slope. There, they embraced a back-to-the-land lifestyle. They grew their own food and made their own clothes while raising their three children. The Eshericks' lifestyle was rural, though not entirely off the grid, as their proximity to the Philadelphia Main Line afforded them railway access to urban Philadelphia.

A Philadelphia native, Wharton Esherick had studied painting at the Pennsylvania Museum and School of Industrial Art and the Pennsylvania Academy of the Fine Arts. He initially tried to make a career as an impressionist painter, but pivoted to woodcarving in the early 1920s. By 1926, having moved into sculpture and furniture making, he built himself a new workspace (now known as the Wharton Esherick Studio) that was a short walk uphill from the family home. In the late 1920s and through the 30s, amidst his and Letty's protracted marital separation, Wharton gradually made the Studio his full-time residence. For forty years, he expanded the building, altered its interiors, and erected new buildings alongside it to create the sculptural complex that is now preserved as the Wharton Esherick Museum.

The Wharton Esherick Museum was incorporated as a non-profit corporation in 1971, it opened for visitors in 1972, and in 1973 was listed on the National Register of Historic Places. The 1956 Workshop was a private home from 1973 to 2020. It now serves as staff offices and is open to the public on a limited basis through special events and tours. In 1993, the Museum converted Esherick's expressionist log cabin garage into a visitor center. The visitor center includes a small gallery space where the Museum presents exhibitions showcasing its historic collections as well as the works of contemporary artists, designers, and craftspeople.

== Gallery ==
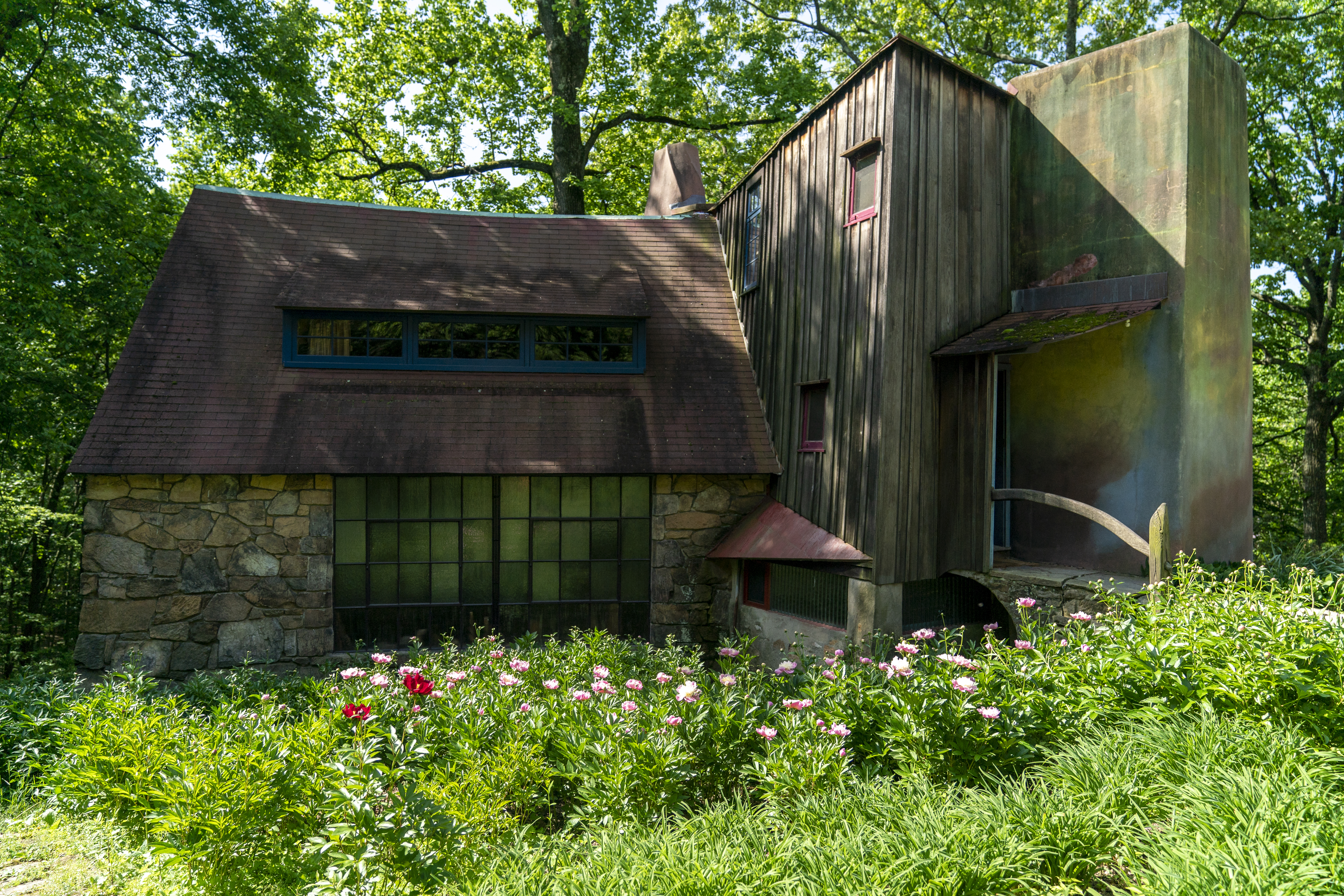
The Wharton Esherick Studio

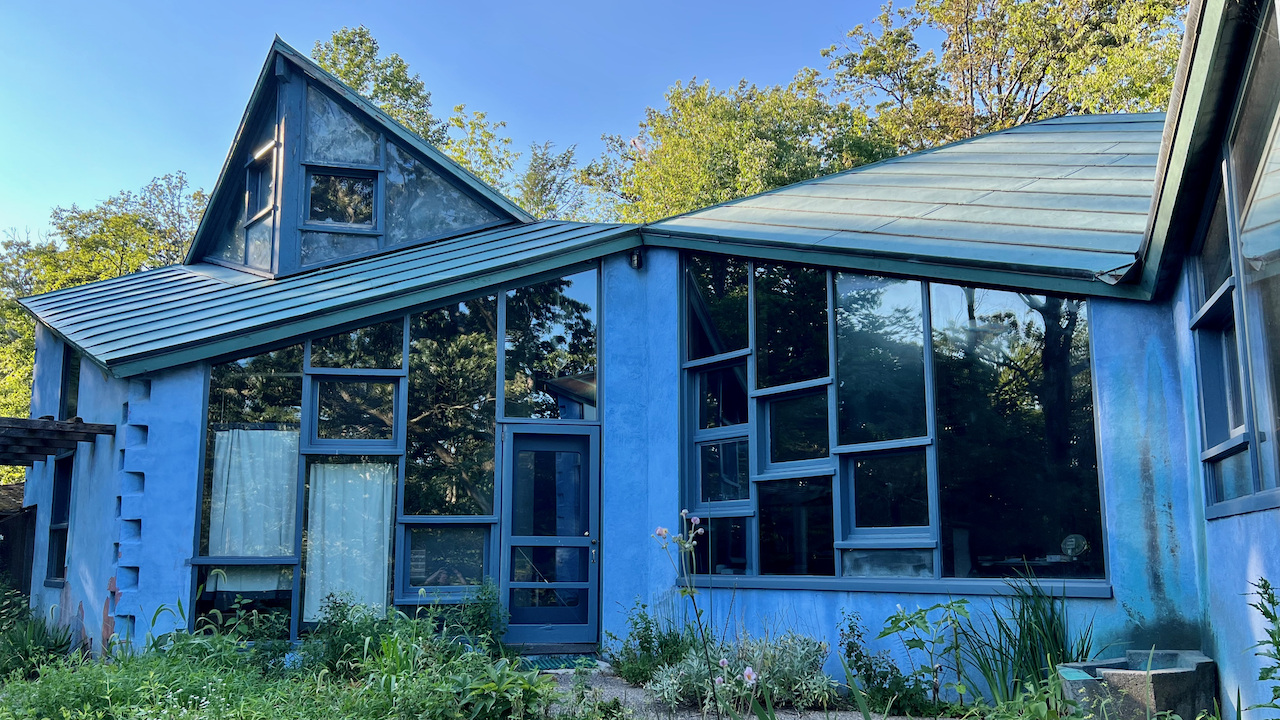
The 1956 Workshop

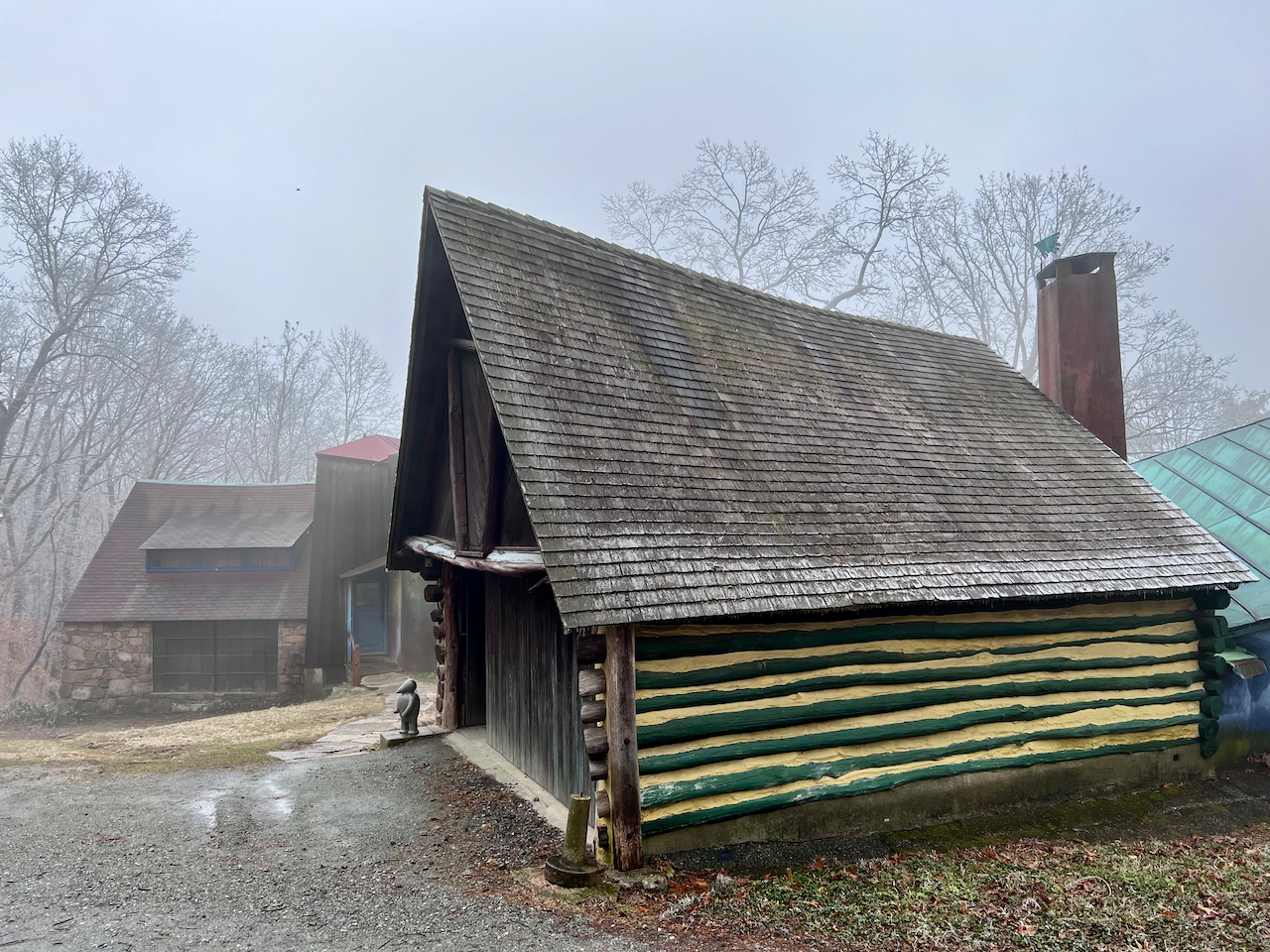
Expressionst log cabin garage

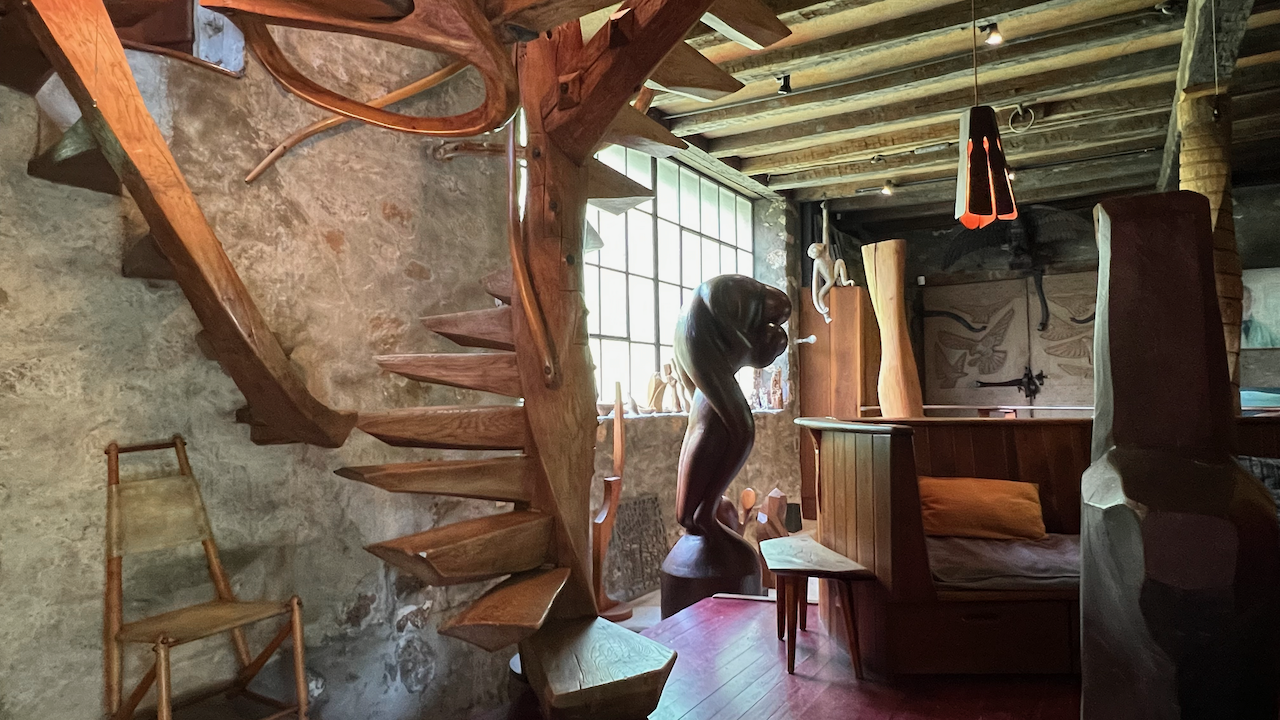
Esherick Studio interior

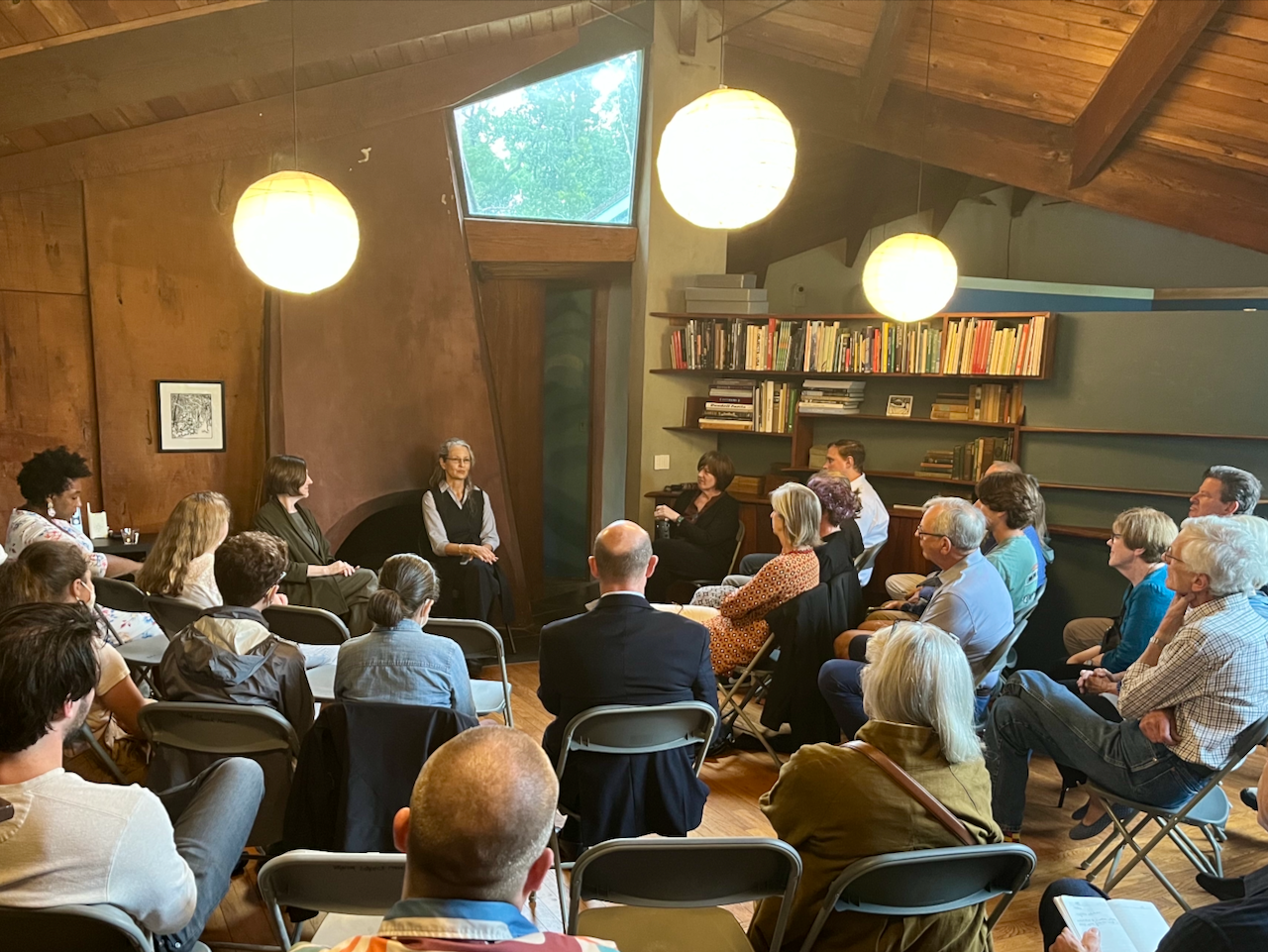
A lecture in the 1956 Workshop

== See also ==
- List of National Historic Landmarks in Pennsylvania
- National Register of Historic Places listings in Chester County, Pennsylvania
