= Gurbanov =

Gurbanov (Azerbaijani: Qurbanov) is a masculine surname of Azerbaijani origin. The feminine surname counterpart would be Gurbanova. People with this name include:

- Bilal Gurbanov (born 2006), Azerbaijani gymnast
- Gurban Gurbanov (born 1972), former Azerbaijani footballer and manager of Qarabağ FK
- Ilgar Gurbanov (born 1986), Azerbaijani footballer for Gabala FK
- Ruslan Gurbanov (born 1991), Azerbaijani footballer for Sabail FK
- Sanan Gurbanov (born 1980), former Azerbaijani footballer and manager of Gabala FK
- Chingiz Gurbanov (1994–2016), soldier and National Hero of Azerbaijan
- Shikhali Gurbanov (1925–1967), Azerbaijani writer and statesman
- Gudrat Gurbanov, Azerbaijani politician
- Agadadash Gurbanov (1911–1965), Azerbaijani actor
- Makhmud Gurbanov (born 1973), Azerbaijani footballer for Sumgayit FK
