= Qaşqaçay =

Qaşqaçay or Kashkachay may refer to:

- Qaşqaçay, Dashkasan, Azerbaijan
- Qaşqaçay, Qakh, Azerbaijan
