= Ilham Aliyev (soldier) =

Azerbaijani military personnel (1961–1990)

- Born: 5 May 1961; Gadabay District, Azerbaijan SSR, Soviet Union
- Died: 19 August 1990 (aged 29); Ashaghy Eskipara, Gazakh District, Azerbaijan SSR, Soviet Union
- Military career
- Allegiance: 1980-1990
- Branch: (Soviet Union) Internal Troops
- Rank: Police Lieutenant
- Conflicts: First Nagorno-Karabakh War
- Awards: National Hero of Azerbaijan; 1992

Not to be confused with the current president of Azerbaijan, Ilham Aliyev.

Ilham Muzaffar oghlu Aliyev (Azerbaijani: İlham Müzəffər oğlu Əliyev; 5 May 1961 in Gadabay – 19 August 1990 in Ashaghy Eskipara) was a military serviceman of Azerbaijan Armed Forces who served during the First Nagorno-Karabakh War and was subsequently awarded the title of National Hero of Azerbaijan.

== Early life and career ==
Ilham Aliyev was born on 5 May 1961 in Gadabay, Azerbaijan SSR. He completed his secondary education in 1978. It was in 1980 he was drafted into the military service. In 1985, Aliyev was admitted to Bryansk Special Secondary School.

After the start of the First Nagorno Karabakh War, Aliyev was sent to the Askipara village of the Qazakh District to defend the region from the offensive of Armenian troops. He was killed during battles for that village. He was buried in Gadabay District. Aliyev was married and had a child.

== Honors ==
- Aliyev was posthumously awarded the title of the "National Hero of Azerbaijan" by Presidential Decree issued on 8 October 1992.
- In 2013, a documentary feature film under the title of "Heroes of the Unconquerable Castle", which communicates the life and battles of Aliyev and of three other National Heroes from Gadabay (Isgender Aznaurov, Aytakin Mammadov and Mazahir Rustamov was produced).

== See also ==
- First Nagorno-Karabakh War
- List of National Heroes of Azerbaijan
