= Qarahəsənli =

Qarahəsənli or Garahasanli or Garahasanly may refer to:

- Qarahəsənli, Agstafa, Azerbaijan
- Qarahəsənli, Nakhchivan, Azerbaijan
