= Agil Mammadov =

Agil Mammadov may refer to:

- Agil Mammadov (footballer, born 1972)
- Agil Mammadov (footballer, born 1989)
- Agil Mammadov (soldier)
