= Aytakin Mammadov =

National Hero of Azerbaijan

- Born: 29 May 1967; Gadabay District, Azerbaijan SSR, USSR
- Died: 18 December 1991 (aged 24); Goygol District, Azerbaijan
- Military career
- Service years: 1990–1991
- Conflicts: First Nagorno-Karabakh War
- Awards: National Hero of Azerbaijan; 1992

Aytakin Israel oglu Mammadov (Azerbaijani: Aytəkin Məmmədov) (29 May 1967, Gadabay, Azerbaijan SSR – December 1991, Goygol, Azerbaijan Republic) — was the military serviceman of Azerbaijan Armed Forces, warrior during the First Nagorno-Karabakh War and National Hero of Azerbaijan.

== Early life and education ==
Mammadov was born on 29 May 1967 in Gadabay, Azerbaijan SSR. In 1984, he completed his secondary education. He had served in the Soviet Army during 1985–1987.

== First Nagorno-Karabakh War ==
Mammadov had entered Ministry of Internal Affairs (Azerbaijan) Special Forces in 1991 and was sent to Goygol against Armenian troops.

In December 1991, he was killed in one of the battles around Goygol District.

== Honors ==
Aytakin Israel oglu Mammadov was posthumously awarded the title of the "National Hero of Azerbaijan" by Presidential Decree No. 264 dated 8 October 1992.

He was buried at the Gokeli village cemetery.

A school in Gokeli village of the Gadabay Rayon of Azerbaijan was named after him. In 2013, he also shot a documentary feature film "Heroes of the Unconquerable of Castle", which tells the life and war of three other National Heroes of Gadabay - Isgender Aznaurov, Ilham Aliyev and Mazahir Rustamov.

== See also ==
- First Nagorno-Karabakh War
- List of National Heroes of Azerbaijan

== Sources ==
- Vugar Asgarov. Azərbaycanın Milli Qəhrəmanları (Yenidən işlənmiş II nəşr). Bakı: "Dərələyəz-M", 2010, səh. 269.
