= Ruslan Polovinko =

- Ukrainian: Руслан Олександрович Половинко
- Ruslan Polovinko, the National Hero of Azerbaijan
- Born: October 21, 1969; Zmiiv, Kharkiv Oblast, Ukraine SSR
- Died: August 6, 1992 (aged 22); Aghdere, Tartar Rayon, Azerbaijan
- Burial place: Zmiiv, Kharkiv Oblast, Ukraine
- Occupation: Military
- Awards: National Hero of Azerbaijan

Ruslan Polovinko (Ukrainian: Руслан Олександрович Половинко; 21 October 1969 – 6 August 1992) was a Ukrainian–Azerbaijani helicopter pilot and lieutenant, who participated in the First Nagorno-Karabakh War within Azerbaijani military. For his actions in the war he was posthumously awarded the title of the National Hero of Azerbaijan.

== Biography ==
Polovinko was born on 21 October 1969, in Zmiiv of the Kharkiv Oblast of Ukraine. In 1987, he enrolled at the Syzran Higher Military Aviation School in Syzran, Russia. After graduating from high school in 1991, he was sent to serve in the Nakhchivan. After the formation of Azerbaijani Air Forces, he continued his service in the Baku Helicopter Squadron.

=== Military service ===
From 1991, he began to fight in the First Nagorno-Karabakh War. Polovinko showed high heroism in the battles for Gubadly, Lachin and Aghdere. On 6 August 1992, after the receipt of information about the siege of Azerbaijani military by the Armenian forces on the Kasapet height, the crew of Mi-24 helicopter, consisting of Ruslan Polovinko, Zakir Majidov (commander) and Javanshir Rahimov rushed to help them to evacuate. After flying three sorties of attacking enemy positions and evacuating injured and fallen soldiers, they were shot down on their fourth flight, resulting in the death of all crew members.

Polovinko was posthumously awarded the title of the National Hero of Azerbaijan on 14 September 1992, by the decree no. 204 of the President of Azerbaijan. He was buried in his native town of Zmiiv. Polovinko was single.
