= Anatoly Nikolayevich Davidovich =

Decorated Azerbaijani soldier (1965–1992)

Anatoly Davidovich
- Anatо́li Nikolа́yeviç Davidо́viç
- Born: 28 March 1965; Kapyl, Minsk, Belarusian SSR
- Died: 13 June 1992 (aged 27); Baku, Azerbaijan
- Military career
- Allegiance: USSR; Azerbaijan
- Branch: Soviet Army; Azerbaijani Armed Forces
- Service years: 1991-1992
- Rank: Major
- Conflicts: First Nagorno-Karabakh War
- Awards: National Hero of Azerbaijan; 1992

Anatoly Nikolayevich Davidovich (Azerbaijani: Anatо́li Nikolа́yeviç Davidо́viç, Belarusian: Анато́ль Мікала́евіч Давідо́віч; 28 March 1965, Kapyl, Minsk, Belarusian SSR – 13 June 1992, Baku, Azerbaijan) was a National Hero of Azerbaijan and soldier during the First Nagorno-Karabakh War.

== Early life and education ==
Anatoly Davidovich was born on 28 March 1965 in Skabin village of Kapyl raion in Minsk, Belarus SSR. Then he moved to Slutsk with his family and graduated from the Secondary School No. 10. in there. In 1989, he graduated from Sumy Higher Military Artillery School in Ukraine and served in the Transcaucasian military unit and the USSR's Western troops in Germany.

Until June 1991, he served in the armed forces of USSR and then in the army of CIS. After rising to the rank of Major, he connected his life with Azerbaijani Armed Forces.

== First Nagorno-Karabakh War ==
Davidovich was the head of an artillery unit. He made great contributions to the formation of the Azerbaijani Armed Forces. In 1992, he was heavily wounded in a fierce battle around Agdam District. Due to his loss of blood, he was sent to the Baku Central Hospital and died on 13 June 1992. He was buried in Slutsk, Belarus. Davidovich was married.

== Legacy and honors ==
Davidovich was posthumously awarded the title of the "National Hero of Azerbaijan" under Presidential Decree No. 273 dated 3 July 1992. A street in the city of Ganja is named after Davidovich, and on 10 April 2015, a memorial plaque was installed in his honor.

He is often a reference point for military cooperation in Azerbaijan-Belarus relations. Members of the military apparatus of the Azerbaijani Embassy in Minsk have visited his mother, Kima Davidovich at her home on numerous occasions. On 2 July 2019, on the instruction of the President Ilham Aliyev, a delegation led by the Minister of Defense of Azerbaijan Colonel General Zakir Hasanov visited Kima while she was being treated in a clinical hospital in Minsk, on the eve of his attendance at the celebrations in honor of the 75th anniversary of the Minsk Offensive.

== See also ==
- First Nagorno-Karabakh War
- List of National Heroes of Azerbaijan
