= Aliaga =

Aliaga or Aliağa or Aliagha may refer to:

== Places ==
- Aliağa, a town and district of İzmir Province, Turkey
- Aliağa, Tarsus, a village in Tarsus district of Mersin Province, Turkey
- Aliaga, Aragon, a town in Spain
- Aliaga, Nueva Ecija, a municipality on Luzon, the Philippines

== Given name ==
- Aliagha Vahid (1895–1955), Azerbaijani poet

== Surname ==
- Fray Luis de Aliaga Martínez (1560–1626), Grand Inquisitor of Spain
- Felipe Pardo y Aliaga (1806–1868), Peruvian poet, satirist, playwright, lawyer, and politician
- Rafael López Aliaga (1961— ), Peruvian politician and businessman

== Other uses ==
- Aliağa (İZBAN), commuter rail station at Aliağa, İzmir in Turkey
- Aliağa Petkim, professional basketball team in Aliağa, İzmir in Turkey
- Aliağa Wind Farm, in the district
- Aliaga (mammal), a fossil genus of mammals in the family Spalacotheriidae

== See also ==
- Aliağalı, a village in the Agdam Rayon of Azerbaijan
