= Sinix =

Sinix may refer to:

- SINIX, computer operating system
- Şınıx, Azerbaijan

== See also ==
- Sinixt, an indigenous peoples of Canada and the United States
