= Yevgeny Karlov =

Azerbaijani soldier

- Born: May 31, 1960; Tula Oblast, RSFSR, USSR
- Died: April 11, 1992 (aged 31); Füzuli, Azerbaijan
- Military career
- Allegiance: Republic of Azerbaijan
- Conflicts: First Nagorno-Karabakh War
- Awards: National Hero of Azerbaijan; 1992

Yevgeny Nikolayevich Karlov (Azerbaijani: Yevgeni Karlov; 31 May 1960 – 11 April 1992) was a soldier during the First Nagorno-Karabakh War in the early 1990s. He was made a National Hero of Azerbaijan.

== Early life and education ==
Karlov was born on 31 May 1960 in Dubovka village of Bogoroditsky District of Tula Oblast. He completed his secondary education at Dubovka village secondary school. In 1977, Karlov was drafted to the military service by the Military Commissariat of Uzlovaya. In 1976, he entered the Syzran Higher Military Aviation School. After the graduation in 1984, he started working as an instructor-pilot. After the establishment of Azerbaijani Armed Forces, Karlov decided to serve here. He first worked as an instructor pilot in Sanqaçal, then in the N military unit in Baku.

=== Personal life ===
Karlov was married and had two children.

== First Nagorno-Karabakh War ==
When the First Nagorno-Karabakh War started, Karlov participated in battles around Aghdam, Aghdara and Fuzuli. On April 11, 1992, he was killed in a battle when Armenian soldiers attacked the territories of Fuzuli District.

== Honors ==
Yevgeny Nikolayevich Karlov was posthumously awarded the title of the "National Hero of Azerbaijan" by Presidential Decree No. 833 dated 7 June 1992.

He was buried at a cemetery in Dubovka village of Bogoroditsky District of Tula Oblast.

== See also ==
- First Nagorno-Karabakh War
- National Hero of Azerbaijan

== Sources ==
- Vugar Asgarov. Azərbaycanın Milli Qəhrəmanları (Yenidən işlənmiş II nəşr). Bakı: "Dərələyəz-M", 2010, səh. 147.
