= Nigar Kocharli =

Azerbaijani businessman (born 1975)

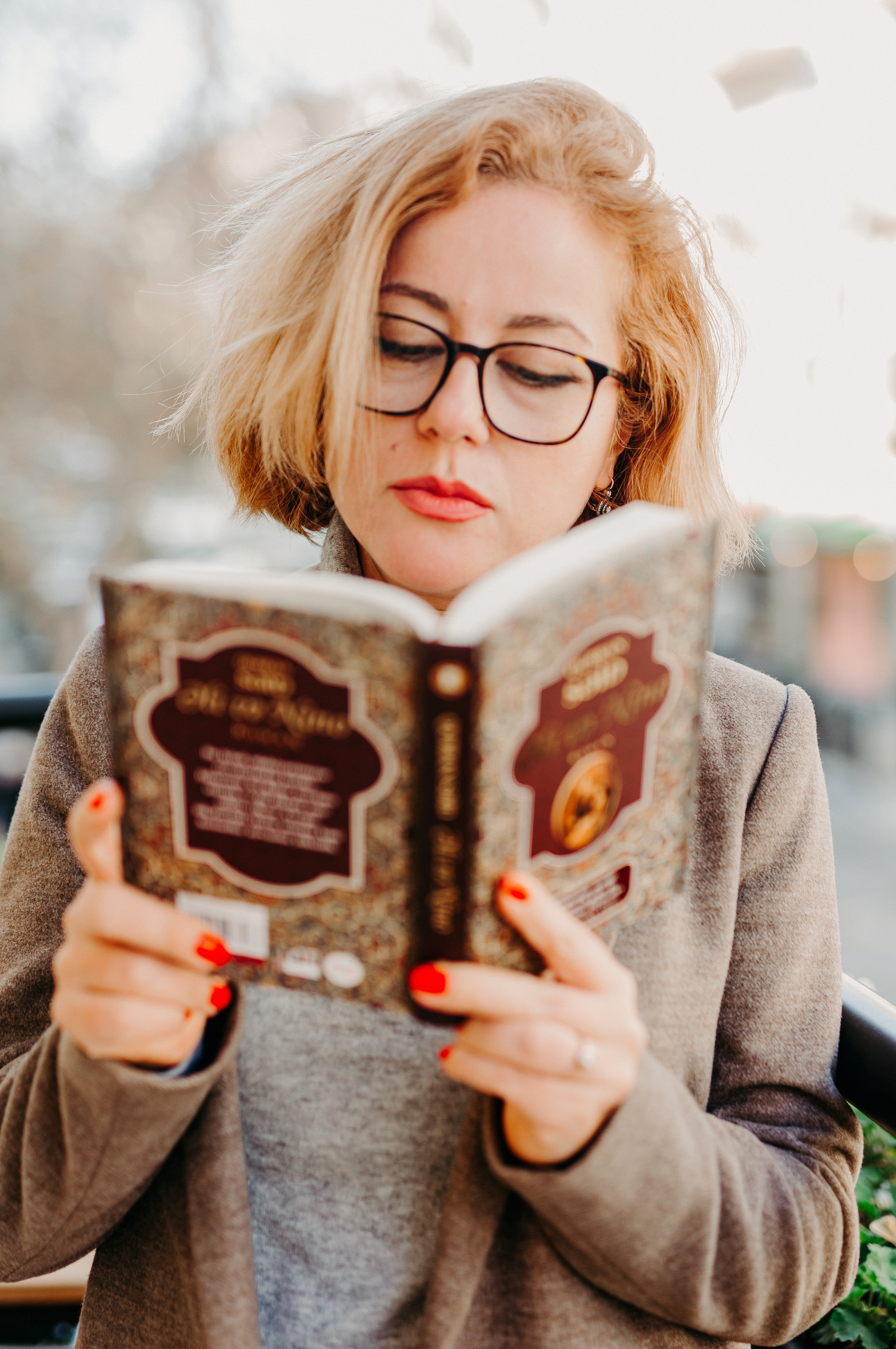
- Born: Nigar Köçərli; October 15, 1975 (age 51); Baku, Azerbaijan
- Occupations: Publisher and Bookseller

Nigar Kocharli (Azerbaijani: Nigar Köçərli, born 15 October 1975) is the CEO and owner of the Ali and Nino bookstore chain and publishing house, and founder of the National Book Award of Azerbaijan.

Kocharli graduated from the Faculty of Mechanics and Mathematics of Baku State University.

In 1997-1999, she was the representative of a foreign company in Azerbaijan, and in 1999-2001 she worked in a United Nations Development Programme project.

Since 2001 Kocharli started to run a book business. On August 17, 2003, Kocharli opened the first Ali and Nino, bookstore with an investment of $600. Currently, "Ali and Nino" bookstores chain consists of 10 bookstores, as well as the www.alinino.az e-shop.

Soon after opening the bookstores, she founded the National Book Award, aiming to promote modern Azerbaijani literature and support local authors.

Kocharli also established an online bookstore selling books in Azerbaijani, Turkish, Russian and English, as well as founding Ali and Nino Publishing House, which translates and publishes classics and contemporary literature, including the novels of Khalid Hosseini.

== Family ==
Nigar is Fridun Kocherli's niece as well as the niece of Tofig Kocherli. She is also married to Shahbaz Khuduoglu.

== Activities ==
National Book Award - It is the first independent literary project of Azerbaijan. It was founded by Nigar Kocherli in 2005.

== Support for women's entrepreneurship ==
Alinino.az website, which has been actively selling online for more than ten years in Azerbaijan, is implementing a project aimed at social support for women entrepreneurs. The site provides an opportunity for women entrepreneurs operating in all parts of Azerbaijan and engaged in small business to present their products for sale on Alinino.az marketplace completely free of charge.

== "Ali and Nino" Publishing House ==
"Ali and Nino" Publishing House is an independent Azerbaijani publishing house founded in 2005. Modern and classic works of the world and Azerbaijan, children's literature, etc. presents publications to Azerbaijani readers

== National Book Fair ==
The National Book Fair was founded in 2020 and is a book fair of independent publishing houses and booksellers. It is held twice a year. Last time it was held in Icherisheher in 2023. Founders of the exhibition - Shahbaz Khuduoglu and Nigar Kocherli.

== Awards ==
On May 4, 2023, Kocharli was awarded the rank of Knight of the French Order of Arts and Letters (Ordre des Arts et des Lettres).
