= Vardadzor (disambiguation) =

Vardadzor is a village in the Gegharkunik Province of Armenia

Vardadzor may also refer to:

- Vardadzor, Askeran, Askeran Province, Artsakh
- Vardadzor, Martakert, Martakert Province, Artsakh
