= Eldar Mammadov =

Eldar Harun oglu Mammadov (Azerbaijani: Eldar Harun oğlu Məmmədov; January 10, 1968 in Baku – February 24, 1993 in Qasapet) was an Azerbaijani military figure. He was awarded the decoration Hero of Azerbaijan for his part in the First Nagorno-Karabakh War.

== Education ==
After completing school No. 189 in Baku, Eldar Mammadov attended the Jamshid Nakhichevanski Military Lyceum in 1985–1989. After graduation, he studied at the Riga Higher Military Academy completing the course with political science degree.

== Career in the military ==
Up until 1991, Mammadov was serving in the Soviet Army in Orenburg Oblast of Russia. Once he returned to Azerbaijan, he continued his service in the missile forces of the Azerbaijani Army. He was later appointed the Head of Department at the Border Troops of Ministry of National Security of Azerbaijan.

== Death ==
Eldar Mammadov served during the First Nagorno-Karabakh war and was killed in action on February 24, 1993, when defending the Qasapet heights and saving other soldiers from enemy fire during the battles in Agdere. By the decree of the President of Azerbaijan No. 247 of December 11, 1994, Mammadov was awarded the title of the National Hero of Azerbaijan. The 2nd Border Post of the Goytapa Border Unit of the Border Service was named after Eldar Mammadov.
