= Kollu =

Kollu may refer to:

- Kollu, Dashkasan, Azerbaijan
- Kollu, Gadabay, Azerbaijan
