= Isgender Aznaurov =

National Hero of Azerbaijan

- Born: 16 August 1956; Bukhara Region, Uzbek SSR, USSR
- Died: 18 April 1993 (aged 36); Gadabay District, Azerbaijan
- Military career
- Service years: 1992–1993
- Conflicts: First Nagorno-Karabakh War
- Awards: National Hero of Azerbaijan; 1995

Isgender Aznaurov (Azerbaijani: İsgəndər Söhrab oğlu Aznaurov; 16 August 1956, Bukhara Region, Uzbek SSR, USSR – 18 April 1993, Gadabay District, Azerbaijan) is a National Hero of Azerbaijan, and the warrior of the First Nagorno-Karabakh War.

== Biography ==
Isgender Aznaurov was born on 16 August 1956 in the village of Galaosiyo of Bukhara Province of Uzbekistan into a Turkish Meskhetian family. From 1963 through 1973, he went to a secondary school. After completing his military service in Cherkessk, Ukraine, he was admitted to the Tashkent Institute of Irrigation and Melioration in 1978 from which he graduated in 1983. After his graduation, he worked in the Ahangaran District of the Tashkent Province.

In 1989, after riots broke out between the Meskhetian Turks who had settled in Uzbekistan and the native Uzbeks in the Fergana Valley of Uzbekistan, hundreds of thousands of Meskhetian Turks fled into exile. The majority, about 70,000, went to Azerbaijan. Aznaurov's family moved to Azerbaijan in 1990 and settled in the Kyur village of Shamkir District. After a while, he started to work in the device manufacturing factory.

== Military service ==
When the Nagorno Karabakh conflict started, Aznaurov joined the ranks of the Azerbaijani Armed Forces as a volunteer in 1992. He severely damaged the positions of Armenians and deployed several ammunition depots. Before the attacks in the summer of 1993, Aznaurov heavily destroyed the most important positions of the Armenians by gunfire. On 18 April 1993, he died in a battle around the Orukdash village of Gadabay District.

He was buried at Martyrs' Lane in Baku.

== Family ==
Aznaurov was married and had three children.

== Awards ==
Aznaurov was posthumously awarded the title of "National Hero of Azerbaijan" by Presidential Decree No. 262 dated 15 January 1995.

- 1995 – National Hero of Azerbaijan
- 1998 – Gold Star Medal

== Memorial ==
A secondary school No. 1 in Kyur village of Shamkir District was renamed after him.

=== Filmography ===
In 2013, a documentary entitled The Heroes of the İmpregnable Fortress was released. It looks into memorials surrounding the lives and battlefields of Aznaurov as well as three other National Heroes of Azerbaijan: Mazahir Rustamov, Ilham Aliyev and Aytakin Mammadov from Gadabay District.

== See also ==
- First Nagorno-Karabakh War
- List of National Heroes of Azerbaijan
- Nizami Mammadov

== Sources ==
- UNHCR (1999b), Background Paper on Refugees and Asylum Seekers from Georgia, United Nations High Commissioner for Refugees
- Vugar Asgarov. Azərbaycanın Milli Qəhrəmanları (Yenidən işlənmiş II nəşr). Bakı: "Dərələyəz-M", 2010, səh. 43–44.
