= Syrkhavend =

Syrkhavend / Nor Ghazanchi Sırxavənd / Նոր Ղազանչի
- Location within Azerbaijan Location within Karabakh Economic Region
- Coordinates: 40°03′54″N 46°41′06″E
- Country: Azerbaijan
  - District: Aghdara

Population (2015)
  - Total: 143
- Time zone: UTC+4 (AZT)

Syrkhavend (Azerbaijani: Sırxavənd) or Nor Ghazanchi (Armenian: Նոր Ղազանչի) is a village located in the Aghdara District of Azerbaijan, in the disputed region of Nagorno-Karabakh. The village had an Azerbaijani majority prior to their expulsion during the First Nagorno-Karabakh War.

== Geography ==
The village of Nor Ghazanchi was founded on the left bank of the Khachen River in the mountainous regions of Murovdag. Its total area is 2181 hectares of which 487 hectares are of agricultural significance and 1582 hectares consists of forest lands. The village is located on the Martakert-Stepanakert mountain road, which was built in the early 1960s. Nor Ghazanchi is 30 km away from Aghdam and Martakert and 40 km away from Stepanakert.

== History ==
Archeological findings from the surrounding landscape shows that there has been a settlement in the immediate area since the 12th century. The current village was founded in the 17th century. A church named St. George's Church was built in the village in the 19th century but was later destroyed. There are numerous khachkars and ancient gravestones that can be found in and around the village.

During the Soviet period, the village was part of the Mardakert District of the Nagorno-Karabakh Autonomous Oblast (NKAO), established in 1923. The village was collectivized in 1931 and received electricity in 1963.

There were 167 people from the village that took part in the Second World War. 65 were killed, in memory of which a monument was erected in the village.

=== First Nagorno-Karabakh War ===
In April 1991, during the First Nagorno-Karabakh War, a territorial executive committee was established with Syrkhavend as its administrative centre by the government of Azerbaijan, as a management centre for 12 Azerbaijani villages in the Martakert region, with a territorial police department, agricultural department, education department, a logistics supply base, an automotive base and two road repair offices. Various enterprises were created and started operating. In December 1991, a village self-defence battalion was created, appointing Bahman Mammadov as head of the battalion.

The village was captured by Armenian forces on March 12, 1992, together with other villages in the Mardakert District – Bashirler, Garashlar, Bash Guneypeye, Orta Guney, Khatynbeyli. Before the ceasefire, there were attempts by Azerbaijan to recapture the area, during which, on November 2, 1992, the "National Hero of Azerbaijan" Anvar Arazov was killed.

== Economy and culture ==
The population is mainly engaged in agriculture and animal husbandry. As of 2015, the village has a municipal building, a house of culture, and a medical centre.

== Demographics ==
According to the 1910 publication of the Caucasian Calendar, Syrkhavend had 430 inhabitants in 1908, most of whom were Tatars (later known as Azerbaijanis). According to the 1921 census of the Azerbaijan SSR, the population of the village was 514.

According to Armenian sources, in 1970, the village had 455 inhabitants and 89 houses, in 1987, 260 inhabitants and 75 houses, and in the beginning of the 1990s, 325 inhabitants and 35 houses. According to Azerbaijani sources, there were around 2,000 people living in the village during the late Soviet period, which would have made it the largest Azerbaijani village in the Mardakert District of the Nagorno-Karabakh Autonomous Oblast.

In 2005 the village had an ethnic Armenian-majority population of 177 inhabitants. As of 2015, the population of the Nor Ghazanchi community is 143 people.
