= Rashad Mirabov =

- Born: 3 May 1975; Mingachevir, Azerbaijan SSR, Soviet Union
- Died: 1995 (aged 19–20); Baku, Azerbaijan
- Military career
- Allegiance: Azerbaijan
- Branch: Azerbaijani Armed Forces
- Conflicts: First Nagorno-Karabakh War
- Awards: National Hero of Azerbaijan

Rashad Akif oghlu Mirabov (Azerbaijani: Rəşad Akif oğlu Mirabov; 3 May 1975 – 17 March 1995) was an Azerbaijani National Hero, a participant in the First Nagorno-Karabakh War, and a serviceman who was killed during the March 1995 events in Azerbaijan.

== Early life ==
Rashad Mirabov was born on 3 May 1975 in Mingachevir, Azerbaijan SSR. In 1982, he entered Secondary School No. 7 in Mingachevir. After completing the ninth grade, he continued his education at an evening school while working as an assistant tailor at the Mingachevir State Drama Theatre.

== Military service ==
Mirabov was conscripted into the Azerbaijani army by the Mingachevir Military Commissariat on 12 May 1993. He received military training and subsequently served in a special-purpose military unit as a reconnaissance and mine-clearance specialist.

In January 1994, his military unit was deployed to the Tartar region and subsequently to the Fuzuli area, where he participated in several military operations during the First Nagorno-Karabakh War. Following the ceasefire, he returned to his previous military unit in Baku.

== Death ==
During the March 1995 events, an attempted coup took place in Azerbaijan. Mirabov was killed on 17 March 1995 while taking part in an operation to neutralize the insurgents.

He was buried in the Martyrs' Lane in Mingachevir. He was unmarried.

== National Hero of Azerbaijan ==
By Decree No. 307 of the President of the Republic of Azerbaijan, dated 4 April 1995, Rashad Akif oghlu Mirabov was posthumously awarded the title of National Hero of Azerbaijan.

In 1997, Secondary School No. 7 in Mingachevir, where Mirabov had studied, was named after him. A bust dedicated to him was erected in front of the school and at the Martyrs' Museum in Mingachevir.

== Sources ==
- Asgarov, Vugar (2010). Azərbaycanın Milli Qəhrəmanları (in Azerbaijani) (2nd revised ed.). Baku: Dərələyəz-M. p. 208.
