= Zakir Majidov =

Azerbaijani National Hero

- Zakir Nusret oglu Majidov
- Zakir Majidov
- Born: June 26, 1956; Hasanabad, Neftchala Rayon, Azerbaijan SSR
- Died: August 6, 1992 (aged 36); Aghdere, Tartar Rayon, Azerbaijan
- Burial place: Baku, Azerbaijan
- Occupation: Military
- Awards: National Hero of Azerbaijan; 1992

Zakir Majidov (Azerbaijani: Zakir Məcidov) (26 June 1956 – 6 August 1992), National Hero of Azerbaijan, was born June 26, 1956, in the Hasanabad village of the Neftchala Rayon of Azerbaijan.

== Education and professional service ==
In 1974, Zakir entered the High Military Aviation School in the Sasovo city of the Ryazan Oblast of Russia. In 1977, he graduated from the same school and received the rank of lieutenant. In 1978, he worked as a mechanic at the Baku airline division. In 1979, he worked in the summer flights on the AN-2 plane at the Zabrat airline division. In 1980, he was appointed a commander of the AN-2 plane at the Zabrat airline division. The young lieutenant had worked in this company for seven years. In 1984, to increase qualifications, he passed the course of six months development for MI-2 helicopter at the Kremenchug Pilots School of Ukraine. Finally, in 1985, he was appointed commander of crew of the MI-2 helicopter.

== Death ==
In February, 1992, Zakir Majidov was appointed commander one of the MI-24 helicopters in the military aviation section in the Gala settlement of the Baku. He participated in the many battles with the same helicopter in Nagorno-Karabakh War. On August 6, 1992, Zakir Majidov flew three times with together crew and successfully accomplished combat missions on the direction of the Kasapet height. He has got combat order for fourth time but it was his last flight. The crew of MI-24 helicopter, 36 year old chief commander Zakir Majidov, 22 year old pilot operator Ruslan Polovinko and 19 year old well-aimed sniper Javanshir Rahimov were killed by missile strike.

== Family ==
He married in November 1991. His son, Fuad, was born after three months his death.

== Awards ==
He was posthumously awarded the title of the National Hero of Azerbaijan on 14 September 1992, by the decree №204 of the President of Azerbaijan Republic.

He was buried at the Alley of Martyrs in the Baku.
