= Red Star Medal =

Red Star Medal may refer to:

- Red Star Medal (China), military decoration of the People's Liberation Army
- Red Star Medal (Azerbaijan), Qizil Ulduz Medal
