= Riad Ahmadov =

Riad Fikret oglu Ahmadov (Azerbaijani: Riad Fikrət oğlu Əhmədov, December 20, 1956 – January 25, 1992) was awarded the decoration Hero of Azerbaijan for his part in the First Nagorno-Karabakh War. Riad Ahmadov was a KGB-trained military officer who led a Special Intelligence unit in the Nagorno-Karabakh battles. Announced as missing in action in the Azeri Dashalty Operation on January 25, 1992 and he was awarded National Hero of Azerbaijan by decree of the President of Azerbaijan Republic No. 833 of June 7, 1992.

== Education ==
Riad Ahmadov graduated from the Baku State University Law School with honors (Cum Laude) in 1979.

== KGB training and career ==
Riad Ahmadov started as a laboratory assistant at the Judicial Examination Institute of the Ministry of Justice of Azerbaijan SSR from 1976 to 1979. He subsequently joined the Department of Preparation of the Law Drafts and Systematizing of Legislation of the same ministry, and served as a senior counselor at the Human Resources Department of the Ministry of Justice in 1980–1981. During his service at the Ministry of Justice he was discovered and recruited to the state's security system in 1981. In that year he attended the Higher School of the Soviet Committee for State Security (also known as KGB) in Minsk and completed his training at the Yuri Vladimirovich Andropov KGB Academy in Moscow.

Promoted to the post of the deputy head of the Intelligence Department of the Ministry of Defense of the Republic of Azerbaijan in 1992.

== Decorations and Honors ==
Riad Ahmadov was awarded several citations for "Faultless Professional Activity and Achievements". In 1988 he was awarded the Jubilee Medal "70 Years of the Armed Forces of the USSR".
