= Agil Mammadov (soldier) =

Agil Samad oglu Mammadov
- Aqil Səməd oğlu Məmmədov
- Born: 30 July 1969; Qubadli District, Azerbaijan SSR
- Died: 7 August 1992 (aged 23); Lachin District, Azerbaijan
- Military career
- Allegiance: Azerbaijan
- Branch: Azerbaijani Armed Forces
- Service years: 1987-1992
- Rank: Soldier
- Conflicts: First Nagorno-Karabakh War
- Awards: National Hero of Azerbaijan; 1993

Agil Samad oglu Mammadov (Azerbaijani: Aqil Səməd oğlu Məmmədov) (30 July 1969, Qubadli District, Azerbaijan SSR – 7 August 1992, Lachin District, Azerbaijan) was the National Hero of Azerbaijan and warrior during the First Nagorno-Karabakh War.

== Early life and education ==
Agil Mammadov was born on 30 July 1969 in Gubadli District of Azerbaijan SSR. After graduating from secondary school No.2 in Qubadli district in 1984, he continued his education at the Khanlig Vocational School No. 126. He began his career in the Qubadli District Road Transport Department.

=== Personal life ===
Mammadov was married and had one daughter.

== National hero ==
Mammadov was posthumously awarded the title of the "National Hero of Azerbaijan" by Presidential Decree No. 457 dated 5 February 1993. He was buried at a Martyrs' Lane cemetery in Qubadli.

== Memorial ==
The secondary school in which he studied was named after him. At present, this school operates in Sumgait. Some streets in Qubadli and Ganja were also named after him.

== See also ==
- First Nagorno-Karabakh War
- List of National Heroes of Azerbaijan
