= Kerim Kerimov (soldier) =

- Kərim Kərimov
- Kerim Kerimov - National Hero of Azerbaijan
- Born: 2 July 1971; Garahasanli, Nakhchivan AR, Azerbaijan SSR, Soviet Union
- Died: 5 May 1992 (aged 20); Talış, Tartar District, Azerbaijan
- Burial place: Garahasanli, Nakhchivan AR, Azerbaijan
- Occupation: Military
- Awards: National Hero of Azerbaijan

Kerim Mahammad oghlu Kerimov (Azerbaijani: Kərim Məhəmməd oğlu Kərimov) (2 July 1971 – 5 May 1992) - National Hero of Azerbaijan was born in the Qarahəsənli village of the Sharur District of Nakhchivan Autonomous Republic of Azerbaijan.

== Life ==
After he finished secondary school, he entered the school of Senior Military Engineering Commanders in Tyumen city of the Tyumen Oblast, Russia. He was an excellent student in the military and political trainings. After the Garabagh events started, the Azerbaijani students who were at the last course of Senior Military Engendering Commanders in Tyumen, decided to return to Azerbaijan and continue their education at the School of Senior Commanders. After having military training in Bilajary, they headed to Goranboy District on 15 April.

== In Battles ==
On 1 May 1992 the operation of neutralizing of the mined territory had started. He has neutralized more than 40 mines, buried by the enemy across the front line. During the operation, one of soldiers was injured. Kerim gave his blood when the soldier was needed blood group "A" which it was the same blood group with the injured soldier. On 5 May, has started the battle for the Talysh hills and they took control over the whole hill till 5 o’clock in the morning but the enemy started the counterattack from the Talysh village with very strong military equipment. Karimov was killed in this battle. After a few days, on 12 June, his body was found and taken from the battlefield and was sent to the Nakhchivan.

== Family ==
He was single.

== Awards ==
He was posthumously awarded the title of National Hero of Azerbaijan by the decree number 193 of the president of Azerbaijan Republic on 11 September 1992.

He was buried in the Qarahəsənli village of the Sharur District. His bust was put Qarahəsənli village. There are schools and streets after his name in both Goranboy District and Sharur District.
