= Mars Rafikov =

Soviet cosmonaut

- Марс Рафиков; Марс Рәфиков
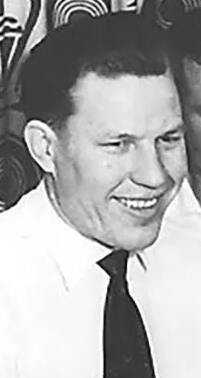
- Rafikov, c. 1960s
- Born: 29 September 1933; Dzhalal-Abad, Kirghiz Soviet Socialist Republic
- Died: 23 July 2000 (aged 66); Almaty, Kazakhstan
- Occupation: Jet fighter pilot
- Space career

Cosmonaut
- Rank: Soviet Air Force
- Selection: Air Force Group 1

Mars Zakirovich Rafikov (Russian: Марс Закирович Рафиков, Tatar: Марс Закир улы Рәфиков; 29 September 1933 – 23 July 2000) was a Soviet cosmonaut who was dismissed from the Soviet space program for disciplinary reasons.

== Biography ==
Rafikov was born on 29 September 1933 in the Kyrgyz SSR to a Tatar family. He gained a pilot's diploma from the Syzran Higher Military Aviation School, and began serving in an air defence unit in the 1950s. On 7 March 1960, Senior Lieutenant Rafikov, age 26, was selected as one of the original 20 cosmonauts along with Yuri Gagarin.

On 24 March 1962, Rafikov was dismissed from the cosmonaut corps, officially for "a variety of offenses, including womanizing and 'gallivanting' in Moscow restaurants, and so forth". Other cosmonauts (notably Gagarin) had exhibited similar behavior, but could not be officially disciplined because of their stature and international reputation. Chief of cosmonaut training Nikolai Kamanin wrote in his diaries that Rafikov had been dismissed for drinking and domestic abuse of his wife, while fellow cosmonaut Gherman Titov later suggested that the reason for his dismissal was because he and his wife had divorced.

To protect the image of the space program, efforts were made to cover up the reason for Rafikov's dismissal. His image, like that of others who were dismissed, was airbrushed out of cosmonaut photos. This airbrushing led to speculation about "lost cosmonauts" even though the actual reasons were often mundane.

Rafikov remained in the military, serving as a pilot in the Soviet–Afghan War, for which he was awarded the Order of the Red Star. He later retired from active service and became part of the DOSAAF civil aviation training programme. Rafikov died on 23 July 2000 in Almaty.
