= Ibrahim Mammadov =

- Ibrahim Ismayil oglu Mammadov
- Born: December 20, 1958; Nakhchivan, Nakhchivan AR, Azerbaijan SSR, Soviet Union
- Died: February 16, 1994 (aged 35); Kalbajar, Kalbajar District, Azerbaijan
- Burial place: Nakhchivan, Azerbaijan
- Occupation: Military
- Children: 2
- Awards: National Hero of Azerbaijan

Ibrahim Ismayil oglu Mammadov (Azerbaijani: İbrahim İsmayıl oğlu Məmmədov; 20 December 1958 – 16 February 1994) was a Soviet and Azerbaijani military leader. He was awarded the title, National Hero of Azerbaijan (1994) posthumously.

== Life ==
Ibrahim Ismayil oglu Mammadov was born on December 20, 1958, in the Nakhchivan city, in Nakhchivan Autonomous Republic, Azerbaijan SSR, Soviet Union.

He finished secondary school # 3 in Nakhchivan city in 1976. He was called for military service after working for a Water Construction Company for a year. After being demobilized from the army in 1979, he went to Moscow and started working at a Car Factory. While working and living in Moscow, he entered the Correspondence Department of the History Faculty of Baku State University in 1988 and graduated from in 1993. He took also a very active part in the meetings conducted by Azerbaijani people in Moscow in order to show the truth about Black January to the world.

He was married and had two children.

== Battles ==
Mammadov returned to Baku along with his family after Khojaly tragedy. He was enlisted in one of the Self Defense Battalions that consisted of volunteers. After Voluntary Battalions were cancelled, he continued his fight against the enemy as a company commander within the National Army in 1993. He was later sent to Kalbajar along with his battalion. On the 16th of February, 1994, in the battle for the strategically important height of Kalbajar region he was shot by a sniper in the last moment and died in the battlefield.

== Awards ==
He was posthumously awarded the title of the National Hero of Azerbaijan by the decree #156 of the president of Azerbaijan Republic on the 20th of June, 1994.

He was buried in the Alley of Martyrs in Nakhcivan city.
