= Mollacəfərli =

Coordinates: 41°10′N 45°25′E

Mollacəfərli is a village in the municipality of Qarahəsənli in the Agstafa Rayon of Azerbaijan.
