= Cücanlı =

Coordinates: 40°37′N 45°28′E

Cücanlı (also, Jujanly, Cügənli) is a village in the municipality of Isaly in the Gadabay District of Azerbaijan.
