= Mazahir Rustamov =

- Born: Mazahir; March 2, 1960; Baku
- Died: August 6, 1992 (aged 32); Mutudara, Gadabay District
- Military career
- Awards: National Hero of Azerbaijan; 1993

Mazahir Rustamov (Rustamov Mazahir Izzet oglu; 1960, Baku – 1992, Gadabay District), was a National Hero of Azerbaijan.

== Early life ==
Vital Rustamov Mazahir Izzet oglu was born on March 2, 1960, in , in an intelligent family. In 1977 he graduated from school # 32 in Nizami district. 1978 entered the history faculty of Baku State University. In 1983 he finished his education with honors diploma. Since 1986 he has been working as a senior laboratory assistant at the Azerbaijan State Institute of Architecture and Civil Engineering. In 1990, he worked as the head of the Department of Foreign Relations with Foreign Countries at the Ministry of State Press. After Armenian troops lashed out Karabakh, killing thousands of innocent people of the region, Mazahir who was filled with love to his Homeland and placed an intrinsic value on zeal and honor, voluntarily joined the Azerbaijani Armed Forces. Subsequently, he was sent to Shinikh village and designated as deputy commander.

== Participation in battles ==
Shinikh was the nearest large village to the Armenian front line where the hamlet of Mutudərə was a very important strategic point and target for Armenian incursions. Using his skills as a military commander and intelligence officer, Mazahir managed to organise a detachment of Azerbaijani troops to organise the village's defence. A major battle raged on 6 August 1992, Mazahir finally blowing himself and a group of attackers with his own hand grenade in a suicidal last stand of great heroism. Eventually, under the leadership of Colonel Jahangir Rustamov, Azerbaijani fighters accounter attacked and reclaimed both Mutudərə and Bashkend

Rustamov Mazahir Izzet oglu was posthumously awarded the title of "National Hero of Azerbaijan" on 5 February 1993. He was buried in the Alley of Martyrs in Baku.

== His family ==
He was married and had a daughter named Tahmina.

== Memorials ==
Memorable board School # 32, one of the streets in the Ahmadli settlement, is named after our heroes. The bronze statue was erected in Gedebey district. Hero's articles have been published in the articles "Say to My Mom," "The Legend Return," "The Road To Ardağ" and many local newspapers and magazines as well as Turkish newspapers Hurriyet and Zaman. In 2013, along with her documentary-feature film "The Heroes of the Unwavering Fortress", about the life and battlefields of the three other National Heroes - Isgender Aznaurov, Ilham Aliyev and Aytekin Mammadov, were taken from Gedebey District.
