= Amiraslan Aliyev =

- Amiraslan Rza oglu Aliyev
- Amiraslan Aliyev - National Hero of Azerbaijan
- Born: August 30, 1960; Nakhchivan, Nakhchivan AR, Azerbaijan SSR
- Died: March 17, 1995 (aged 34); Baku, Azerbaijan
- Burial place: Nakhchivan, Azerbaijan
- Occupation: Military
- Awards: National Hero of Azerbaijan

Amiraslan Rza oglu Aliyev (Azerbaijani: Əmiraslan Rza oğlu Əliyev) (30 August 1960 – 17 March 1995) - National Hero of Azerbaijan was born on August 30, 1960, in the Nakhchivan city of Nakhchivan Autonomous Republic of Azerbaijan.

== Life ==
In 1977, he finished school number 1 named after U. Hadjibeyov in Nakhchivan. After finishing school, he started working as a worker in a wine factory between the years of 1977-1979. He was on military service in the Armed Forces of the USSR between 1979-1981. He also served for a short time in Ukraine and Poland. In 1982-1992, he worked in the Vaykhir Water-Construction Company in the Nakhchivan. In 1987 he graduated from the philology faculty of the Nakhchivan State Pedagogical Institute. The Ministry of National Security Of Azerbaijan called him to serve in Frontier Troops in 1992. He held a number of senior positions. For the excellent service, Lieutenant Amiraslan Aliyev was appointed as the chief officer of the Headquarters. While serving in this post, he succeeded to establish order in the border region and protect the state borders.

Aliyev died on 17 March 1995, during an attempt to "throw the Government".

== Family ==
He was married and had three children.

== Awards ==
He was posthumously awarded the title of the National Hero of Azerbaijan by the decree no 307 of the president of the Republic of Azerbaijan on 4 April 1995.

He was buried in the Alley of Martyrs in Nakhchivan.
