= Syzran Higher Military Aviation School =

Military academy of the Russian Aerospace Forces

- Russian: Сызранское высшее военное авиационное училище лётчиков
- Great emblem of the Syzran Higher Military Aviation School
- Active: from March 1940
- Country: Russia; Soviet Union
- Type: Military academy
- Part of: Russian Armed Forces; Soviet Armed Forces
- Garrison/HQ: 1, Zhukov st., Syzran, Samara Oblast
- Nickname(s): SVVAUL
- Engagements: Soviet–Afghan War; First Chechen War; Russo-Georgian War; Russian military intervention in the Syrian civil war
- Website: www.svvaul.ru

Commanders
- Current commander: Brigadier general Alexander Asanov

The Syzran Higher Military Aviation School (Russian: Сызранское высшее военное авиационное училище лётчиков, romanized: Syzranskoye vyssheye voyennoye aviatsionnoye uchilishche lyotchikov) is a military academy of the Russian Aerospace Forces, responsible for training airmen of the Russian Armed Forces. It is a branch of the Zhukovsky – Gagarin Air Force Academy.

== History ==
The school originated from the Saratov Military Aviation School of Pilots (SVAShP), formed in March 1940. In 1941, after the Axis invasion of the Soviet Union, the pilot school was transformed into a glider school. After the war, the school was transferred to Pugachyov in Saratov Oblast and was renamed the Airborne Glider School. In 1952, the school received the name of the 160th Military School of Pilots and from 1953 passed to the development of a fundamentally new aircraft technology - helicopters. Since 1960 the school has been located in Syzran, Samara Oblast, and from 1963 was named Syzran Military Aviation School for pilots. In 1966 the school was transferred to the status of a higher school. In 1998, the school was reorganized into the Syzran Military Aviation Institute. Graduates of the school have taken part in the United Nations peacekeeping operations in Vietnam, Angola, Tajikistan, UNPROFOR in Yugoslavia, UNAMSIL in Sierra Leone, Sudan and other countries.

The school's 109th Training Aviation Regiment at Bezenchuk flying Mil Mi-2 and Mil Mi-8 helicopters was disbanded in 2003.

The school now operates the Mil Mi-2, Mil Mi-8T and Mil Mi-24V, Kazan Ansat, and the Kamov Ka-226T.<

The school's units now include:

- 131st Training Aviation Regiment — Saratov-Sokol — Mi-2, Mi-8
- 484th Training Helicopter Regiment — Syzran — Mi-24
- 626th Training Helicopter Regiment — Pugachyov — Mi-2, Mi-8, Mi-24
- Branch in Kirov, Kirov Oblast

== Structure ==
- Faculty of Aviation
- Special Faculty
- Officer Courses

== Commanders ==
The following officers commanded the school:

- Yakov Utkin (1940–1942)
- Mikhail Odintsov (1942–1946)
- Mikhail Sitkin (1947–1953)
- Dmitri Makarov (1953–1958)
- Ivan Kulichev (June 1958 – April 1961)
- Fyodor Kisel (1961–1969)
- Valentin Aleksentsev (1970–1977)
- Aleksey Didyk (1977–1986)
- Aleksey Bazarov (1986–1999)
- Alexey Pishenin (1999–2004)
- Viktor Ukolov (2004–2009)
- Nikolai Yartsev (2009–2013)
- Alexander Asanov (2013–Present)

== Notable graduates ==
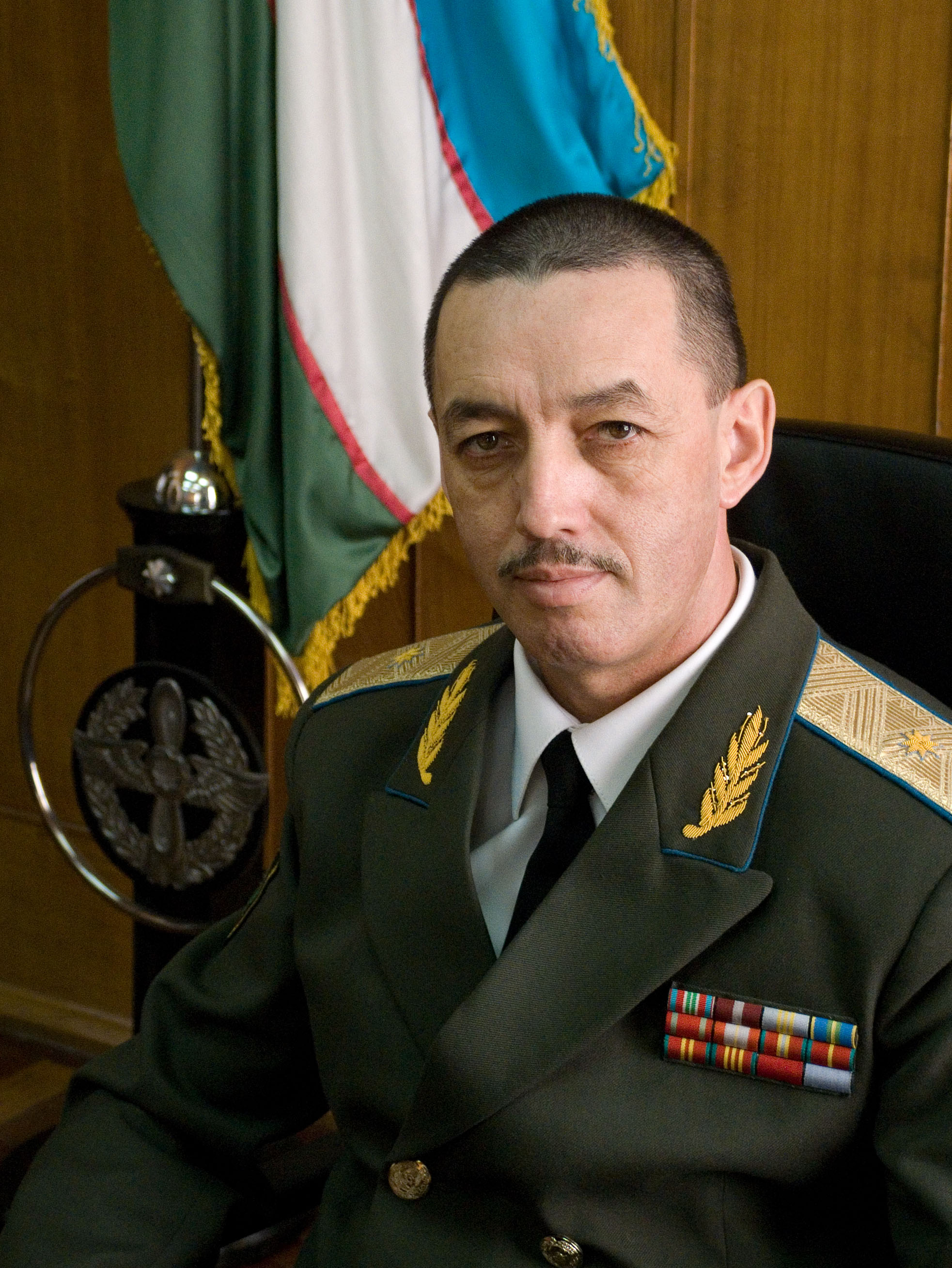
Abdulla Xolmuhamedov

- Mars Rafikov, Soviet cosmonaut
- Sultan Sosnaliyev, former Minister of Defence of Abkhazia
- Ruslan Polovinko, Ukrainian–Azerbaijani helicopter pilot
- Yevgeny Karlov, Russian-born soldier during the First Nagorno-Karabakh War
- Abdulla Xolmuhamedov, Commander of the Uzbekistan Air and Air Defence Forces
- Ivan Yefimovich Zhukov, pilot, Hero of the Soviet Union

== Gallery ==
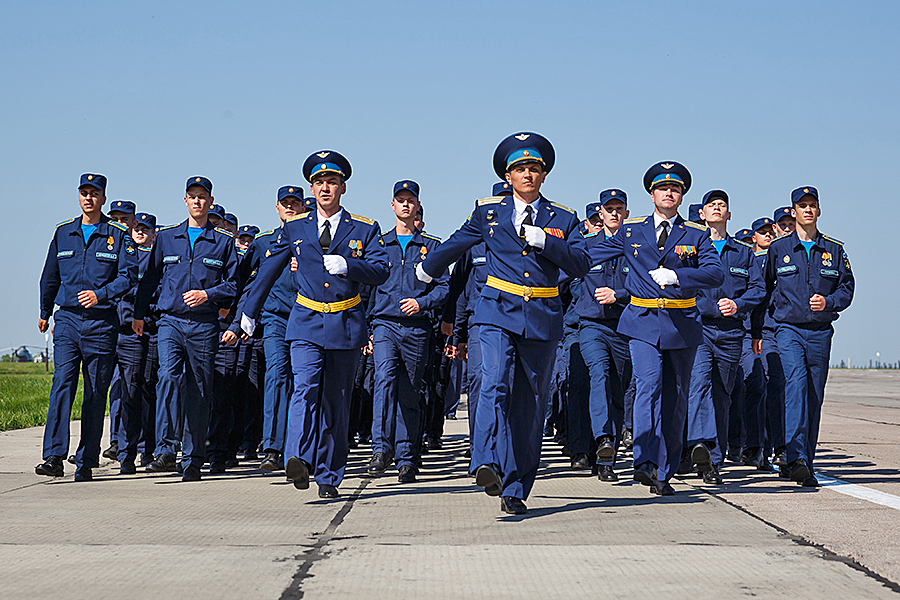

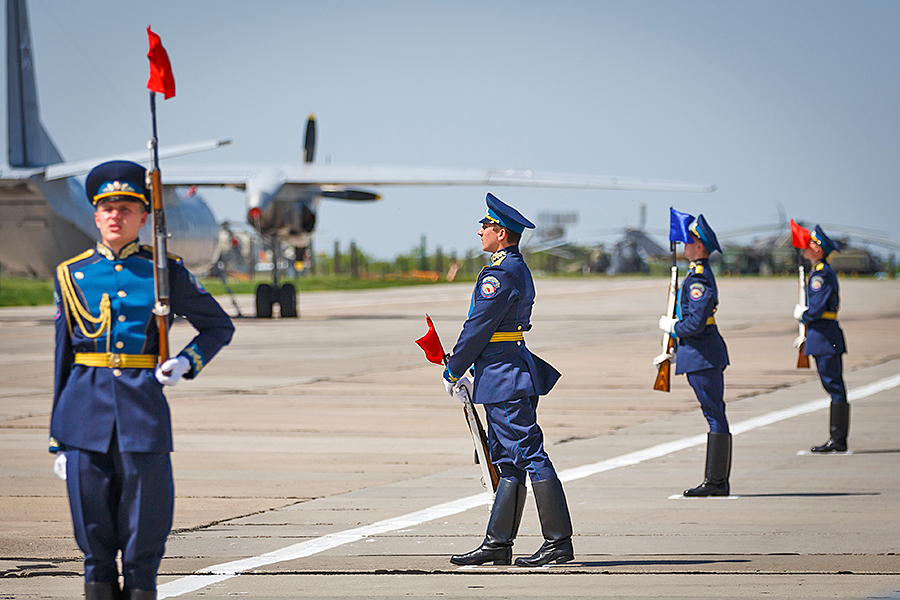

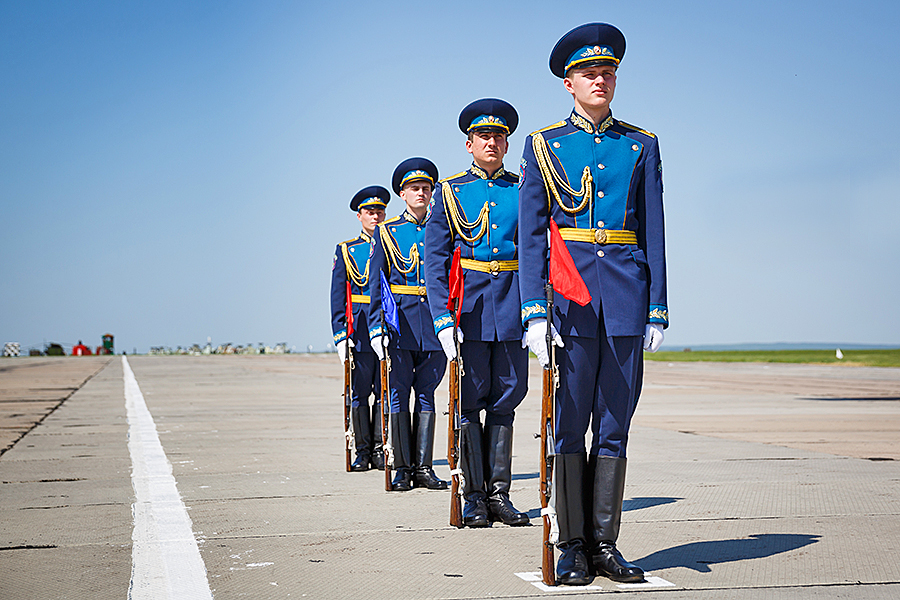

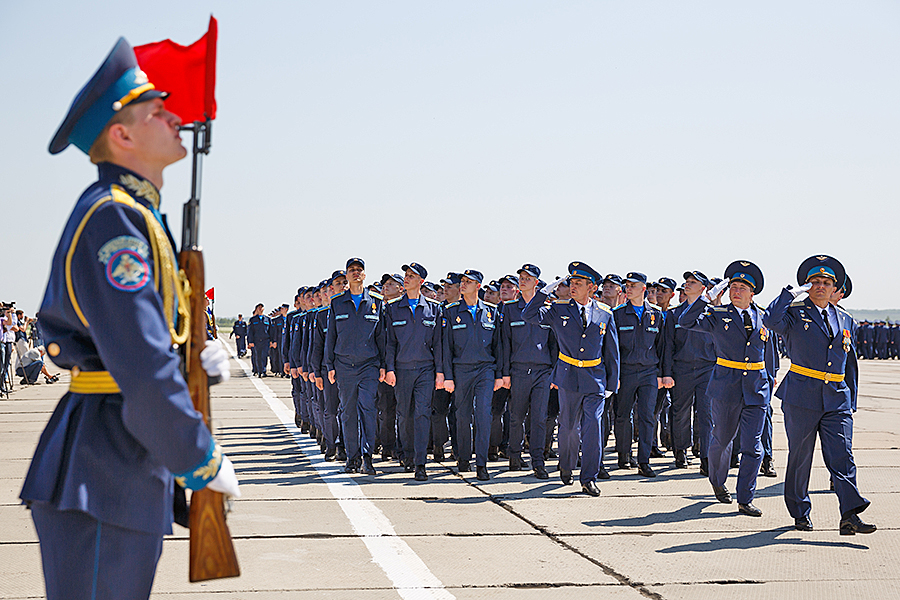

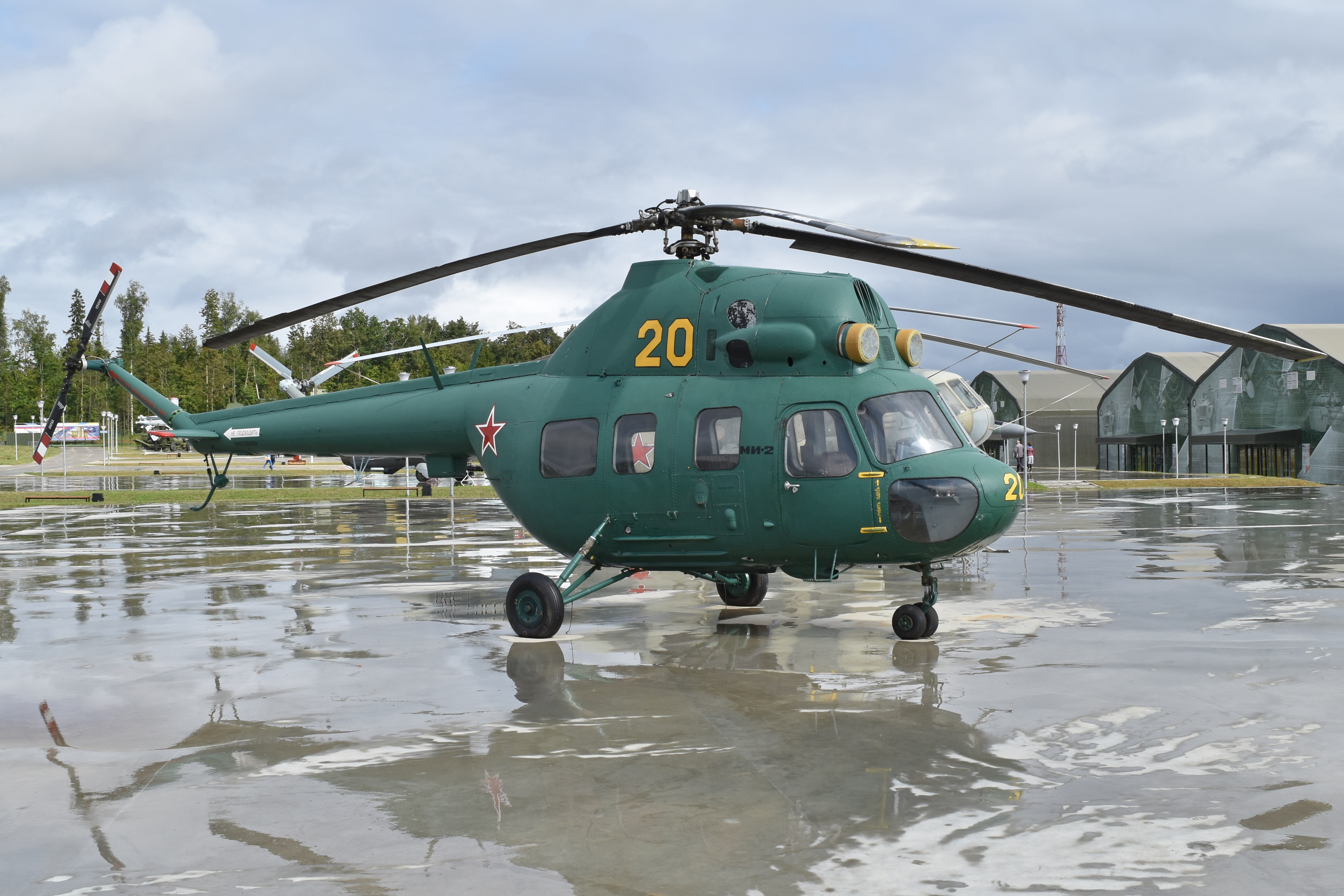
