= Nizami Mammadov =

National Hero of Azerbaijan

- Born: 12 January 1958; Khankendi, Azerbaijan SSR, USSR
- Died: 29 March 1992 (aged 34); Shusha, Azerbaijan
- Military career
- Service years: 1991–1992
- Conflicts: First Nagorno-Karabakh War
- Awards: National Hero of Azerbaijan; 1995

Nizami Mammadov (Azerbaijani: Nizami Murad oğlu Məmmədov) (12 January 1958, Khankendi, Azerbaijan SSR, USSR – 29 March 1992, Shusha, Azerbaijan) is a National Hero of Azerbaijan, and the warrior of the First Nagorno-Karabakh War.

== Life ==
Nizami Mammadov was born on January 12, 1958, in Khankendi. After graduating from school number 4 named after Nizami Ganjavi served in the ranks of the Soviet army in the Irkutsk region in 1975-1977.

With the beginning of the Nagorno-Karabakh conflict, Nizami went to war. After that, a police officer, he transferred to Shusha, where he continued his service. Mammadov also participated in the delivery of food to self-defense battalions, and in a number of battles against the Armenian armed forces. Participated in a number of operations in the villages of Malibeyli, Galaderesi. On March 29, 1992, he was killed by a sniper. At the time of his death, Nizami was married. He had three children. By the decree of the President of the Republic of Azerbaijan dated October 8, 1992, Mammadov Nizami Murad oglu was awarded the title of National Hero of Azerbaijan (posthumously).

He was buried in the village of Deymadagly, Barda region.

== Sources ==
- Əsgərov, Vüqar (2005). Azərbaycanın Milli Qəhrəmanları (PDF). Baku: Qapp-poliqraf. p. 250.
