= Agil Guliyev =

National Hero of Azerbaijan

- Born: 19 September 1963; Urud, Sisian District (Qarakilsə)
- Died: 25 February 1992 (aged 28); Khojaly
- Military career
- Allegiance: USSR; Azerbaijan
- Branch: Azerbaijani Army
- Unit: Azerbaijani Armed Forces
- Conflicts: First Nagorno-Karabakh War

Agil Guliyev (full name: Agil Sahib oglu Guliyev; September 19, 1963, Urud, Sisian District (Qarakilsə) – February 25, 1992, Khojaly) — National Hero of Azerbaijan, martyr of the First Nagorno-Karabakh War.

== Life ==
Agil Sahib oglu Guliyev was born on September 19, 1963, in the village of Urud, Sisian District, Armenia. On February 25, 1992, his comrades-in-arms were carrying Guliyev on a stretcher, trying to save him from the Khojaly genocide. All the residents of Khojaly were well aware of his exceptional services in the city's long-term defense. Taking turns, they managed to bring him as far as the vicinity of Kətik village. However, during a mountain engagement, they fell into an ambush by Armenian soldiers. All those escorting Agil Guliyev were killed, and he was also struck by a bullet. His body could only be recovered five days later, on March 2, from the site of the incident. In 1992, he was buried in the Martyrs’ Alley in Baku.

== Honors and awards ==
Agil Guliyev was posthumously awarded the title of National Hero of Azerbaijan by Decree No. 883 dated June 7, 1992, signed by Isa Gambar, acting president of the Republic of Azerbaijan. In 1999, President Heydar Aliyev formally presented the high award bestowed upon the National Hero to his father, Sahib Guliyev.
