= Tofig Kocharli =

Soviet/Azerbaijani historian (1929–2007)

Tofig Kocharli Tofiq Köçərli
- Born: February 11, 1929; İsalı, Gadabay Rayon, Azerbaijan SSR
- Died: October 31, 2007 (aged 78); Baku, Azerbaijan
- Education: Azerbaijan State University, Moscow State University
- Known for: extensive work on the history of Karabakh and Nakhchivan
- Scientific career
- Fields: pre-historic Azerbaijan, history of Azerbaijan, specifically its Karabakh and Nakhchivan regions
- Workplaces: Azerbaijan National Academy of Sciences

Tofig Gasym oghlu Kocharli (Azerbaijani: Tofiq Qasım oğlu Köçərli; Russian: Тофиг Гасым оглы Кочарли; February 11, 1929 – October 31, 2007) was a Soviet and Azerbaijani historian, former deputy to Supreme Soviet of Azerbaijan SSR, member of Azerbaijan National Academy of Sciences, most prominently for his work on the histories of Azerbaijani regions of Karabakh and Nakhchivan.

== Biography ==
=== Early years and development ===
Tofig Kocharli was born on February 11, 1929, in İsalı village of Gadabay District, Azerbaijan SSR. After finishing secondary school, he entered Azerbaijan State University in 1945. While in university, due to good grades, Kocharli skipped his 2nd year right to the 3rd year, and graduated with a Bachelor's degree in History in 1950. In 1951-1952, he finished his doctoral studies, receiving a Ph.D. in History from Moscow State University within a year and a half. At age 36, he was the youngest PhD in Azerbaijan SSR. In 1950-1951, Kocharli worked as a teacher in Quba Pedagogical Institute, in 1952-1953 as the dean in Aghdam Pedagogical Institute, in 1953-1956 as a professor and docent in Ganja Pedagogical University.

=== Career ===
From 1957 until 1965, he was the senior scientific researcher at the Communist Party History Institute under the Azerbaijan Central Committee of the Communist Party. In 1965, he was appointed dean of Baku Higher Party School and in June 1972 - its rector. In 1990-1991, he worked as the senior lecturer at the same school. Since 1981, Kocharli was a correspondent member and from 1989, permanent member of Azerbaijan National Academy of Sciences. In 1993-2001, he served as the scientific researcher of Social Political Research Institute of the National Academy of Sciences of Azerbaijan and from 2002 until his death in 2007 he was the senior scientific researcher of the Archeology and Ethnography Institute of the academy. Kocharli has extensively researched issues related to the history of Azerbaijan and published many books, monographs, over 120 scientific articles on the subject. Four of his books were published abroad. Among his contributions is research on Azerbaijan Democratic Republic, Karabakh and Nakhchivan. He served as a deputy to the Supreme Soviet of Azerbaijan SSR and was a member of the Azerbaijan National Council in 1992. He was also a member of the Azerbaijan parliamentary commission for investigation of the Black January massacre. He has been awarded with Order of the Red Banner of Labour and many other medals and orders of the Soviet Union and Azerbaijan.

In 2009, a book "Ruhla söhbət" (in Russian, translated "Open Conversation") was written by Professor Rafig Aliyev about the life and contributions of Tofig Kocharli. Most of the information was from his memoirs and his daughter Irada Kocharli. He left behind 6 children and 12 grandchildren.

== Works ==
- "История Азербайджана". ("History of Azerbaijan) Volume 3, Part 1 (Chapter XXVII 6, 4, 5) Baku, 1963
- "Великий подвиг". ("Great act of bravery") Baku, 1965
- "История КПСС". ("History of CPSS) Volume 4, Book I (Chapters 10 & 3) Moscow, 1970
- "История КПСС". ("History of CPSS) Volume 4, Book II (Chapters 17 & 2) Moscow, 1971
- "Tarixi saxtalaşdırmalar əleyhinə". ("Against historical falsifications") Baku, 1972
- "Bəli, Yalan üzərində sülh olmaz". ("Affirmative: no peace based on lies") Baku, 1997
- "İstiqlal və suverenlik". ("Independence and sovereignty") Baku, 1998
- "Qarabağ: yalan və həqiqət". ("Karabakh: lies and truth") Baku, 1998
- "Yaddan çıxmaz Qarabağ". ("Unforgettable Karabakh"), Naghshijahan, Nakhchivan. Baku 1998
- "Карабахское ханство и российская империя". ("Karabakh Khanate and Russian Empire") Moscow, 2000
- "Erməni saxtakarlığı". ("Armenian falsifications") Baku, 2001
- "Qarabağ". ("Karabakh") Baku, 2002
- "Məqalələr". ("Articles") Baku, 2003-2004
- "Armenian Deception". Baku, 2004
- "Naxçivan: Uydurmalar və Tarixi Həqiqətlər". ("Nakhchivan: Myths and Historical Truth") Baku, 2005
- "К истории Карабахского вопроса". ("Towards the history of Karabakh conflict") Baku, 2009
