= Anvar Arazov =

National Hero of Azerbaijan

- Ənvər Arazov
- Born: 2 December 1953; Ganja, Azerbaijan SSR
- Died: 2 November 1992 (aged 38); Syrkhavend, Aghdam, Azerbaijan
- Military career
- Allegiance: Azerbaijan
- Branch: Azerbaijani Armed Forces
- Service years: 1991-1992
- Conflicts: First Nagorno-Karabakh War
- Awards: National Hero of Azerbaijan; 1992

Anvar Talish oglu Arazov (Azerbaijani: Ənvər Arazov) (2 December 1953, Ganja, Azerbaijan SSR - 2 November 1992, Syrkhavend, Aghdam, Azerbaijan) was the National Hero of Azerbaijan and warrior during the First Nagorno-Karabakh War.

== Early life and education ==
Arazov was born on 2 December 1953 in Ganja, Azerbaijan SSR. He completed his secondary education at the Secondary School No. 15. Then he continued his education at the vocational school. He entered the Ganja Polytechnical Technicum. In 1974, Arazov was drafted to the Soviet Armed Forces and served in the Northern Fleet.

After completing his military service, he returned to Ganja and started working at the Crystal Factory. At the same time, Arazov completed his unfinished education and graduated from the college in 1980.

== Personal life ==
Arazov was married and had one daughter.

== First Nagorno-Karabakh war ==
When Armenians attacked the territories of Azerbaijan, Arazov started to work at the Ministry of Internal Affairs of Azerbaijan and went to the front-line. In 1989, he participated in battles for the liberation of Çaykənd. In 1992, he was appointed the deputy director of the National Defense Headquarter in Ganja and in August 1992, the regiment commander in Tartar. Arazov was promoted to the rank of colonel.

Arazov also participated in several successful military operations in the Aghdara District. On 2 November 1992 he was killed in a heavy battle around the village of Sırxavənd of Agdam Rayon of Azerbaijan.

== Honors ==
Anvar Talish oglu Arazov was posthumously awarded the title of the "National Hero of Azerbaijan" by Presidential Decree No. 290 dated 6 November 1992.

He was buried at a Martyrs' Lane cemetery in Ganja.

== See also ==
- First Nagorno-Karabakh War
- List of National Heroes of Azerbaijan

== Sources ==
- Vugar Asgarov. Azərbaycanın Milli Qəhrəmanları (Yenidən işlənmiş II nəşr). Bakı: "Dərələyəz-M", 2010, səh. 36.
