= Dördlər, Gadabay =

Dordlar
- Azerbaijani: Dördlər
- Location within Azerbaijan
- Coordinates: 40°37′N 45°27′E
- Country: Azerbaijan
- District: Gadabay
- Municipality: Isaly
- Time zone: UTC+4 (AZT)
  - Summer (DST): UTC+5 (AZT)

Dördlər (also, Dordlar and Dordlyar) is a village in the Gadabay District of Azerbaijan. The village forms part of the municipality of Isaly.
