= Nadir Aliyev =

National Hero of Azerbaijan

- Nadir Əliyev
- Born: 30 July 1962; Aliağalı, Agdam, Azerbaijan SSR
- Died: 22 July 1993 (aged 30); Qiyaslı, Agdam, Azerbaijan
- Military career
- Allegiance: Azerbaijan
- Branch: Azerbaijani Armed Forces
- Service years: 1991–1993
- Conflicts: First Nagorno-Karabakh War
- Awards: National Hero of Azerbaijan; 1994

Nadir Alısh oglu Aliyev (Azerbaijani: Nadir Alış oğlu Əliyev; 30 July 1962, Aliağalı, Agdam, Azerbaijan SSR – 22 July 1993, Qiyaslı, Agdam, Azerbaijan) was the National Hero of Azerbaijan and warrior during the First Nagorno-Karabakh War.

== Early life and education ==
Aliyev was born on 30 July 1962 in Aliağalı village of Agdam raion of Azerbaijan SSR. He studied at Baku Polytechnicum from 1977 to 1981. In 1991, he graduated from the Academy of the State Security Service of the Republic of Azerbaijan named after F.E. Dzerzhinski, and in 1993, from the Faculty of Law of Baku State University. Aliyev served his military service in the State Security Service and was appointed chief attorney in the Mardakert (Agdara) Division of the Azerbaijan State Security Committee from September to December 1991 and in the Agdere District Division of the Karabakh Department of the Ministry of National Security of the Republic of Azerbaijan since 1992.

Aliyev was married and had two children.

== First Nagorno-Karabakh War ==
In January 1993, he was appointed chief operating officer of the Aghdam Region Department of the Ministry of National Security. On 22 July 1993, Aliyev was shot dead while taking part in the battles for the village of Qiyasli.

== Honors ==
Nadir Alish oglu Aliyev was posthumously awarded the title of the "National Hero of Azerbaijan" under Presidential Decree No. 218 dated 9 October 1994.

Aliyev was buried at a Martyrs' Lane cemetery in Baku. A secondary school No. 282 in Suraxanı raion of Baku was named after him.

== See also ==
- First Nagorno-Karabakh War
- List of National Heroes of Azerbaijan
