= Chingiz Gurbanov =

Azerbaijani soldier (1994–2016)

- Çingiz Qurbanov
- Born: November 24, 1994; Qusar District, Azerbaijan
- Died: December 29, 2016 (aged 22); Tovuz District, Azerbaijan
- Burial place: Martyrs' Lane in Qusar District
- Military career
- Allegiance: Azerbaijan
- Branch: Azerbaijani Armed Forces
- Service years: 2016
- Conflicts: Preventing the provocation of the Armenian intelligence
- Awards: National Hero of Azerbaijan; 2017

Chingiz Gurbanov (Azerbaijani: Çingiz Salman oğlu Qurbanov) (November 24, 1994, Qusar District, Azerbaijan – December 29, 2016, Tovuz District, Azerbaijan) was a soldier of the Azerbaijani Armed Forces who was recognized as a "National Hero of Azerbaijan".

== Biography ==
Chingiz Gurbanov was born on 24 November 1994 in the village of Khazra in Qusar, Azerbaijan. After graduating from secondary school in 2012, he entered Azerbaijan Technical University, from which he graduated in 2016. He was drafted to Azerbaijani Armed Forces serving from 2016 through 2017.

== Military career ==
Chingiz Gurbanov was killed in a shootout with the Armenian forces on the Azerbaijani-Armenian border on December 29, 2016. As a result, Chingiz Gurbanov's body had remained on the Armenian side for more than three weeks. After many protests, the Armenian side finally handed over Chingiz Gurbanov's body to the Azerbaijani side on February 5, 2017.

== Memorial ==
On February 7, 2017 Chingiz Gurbanov was posthumously awarded the title of “National Hero of Azerbaijan” with the decree of Ilham Aliyev, the President of the Republic of Azerbaijan and Supreme Commander-in-Chief of the Azerbaijani Armed Forces for his personal courage in fulfilling his special military services and commitment to maintain the territorial integrity of the Republic of Azerbaijan. The documentary, entitled "The dream that came true", chronicles the life and military service of Chingiz Gurbanov.

Chingiz Gurbanov was buried on February 6 at the Martyrs' Lane cemetery in Qusar District.

=== Awards ===
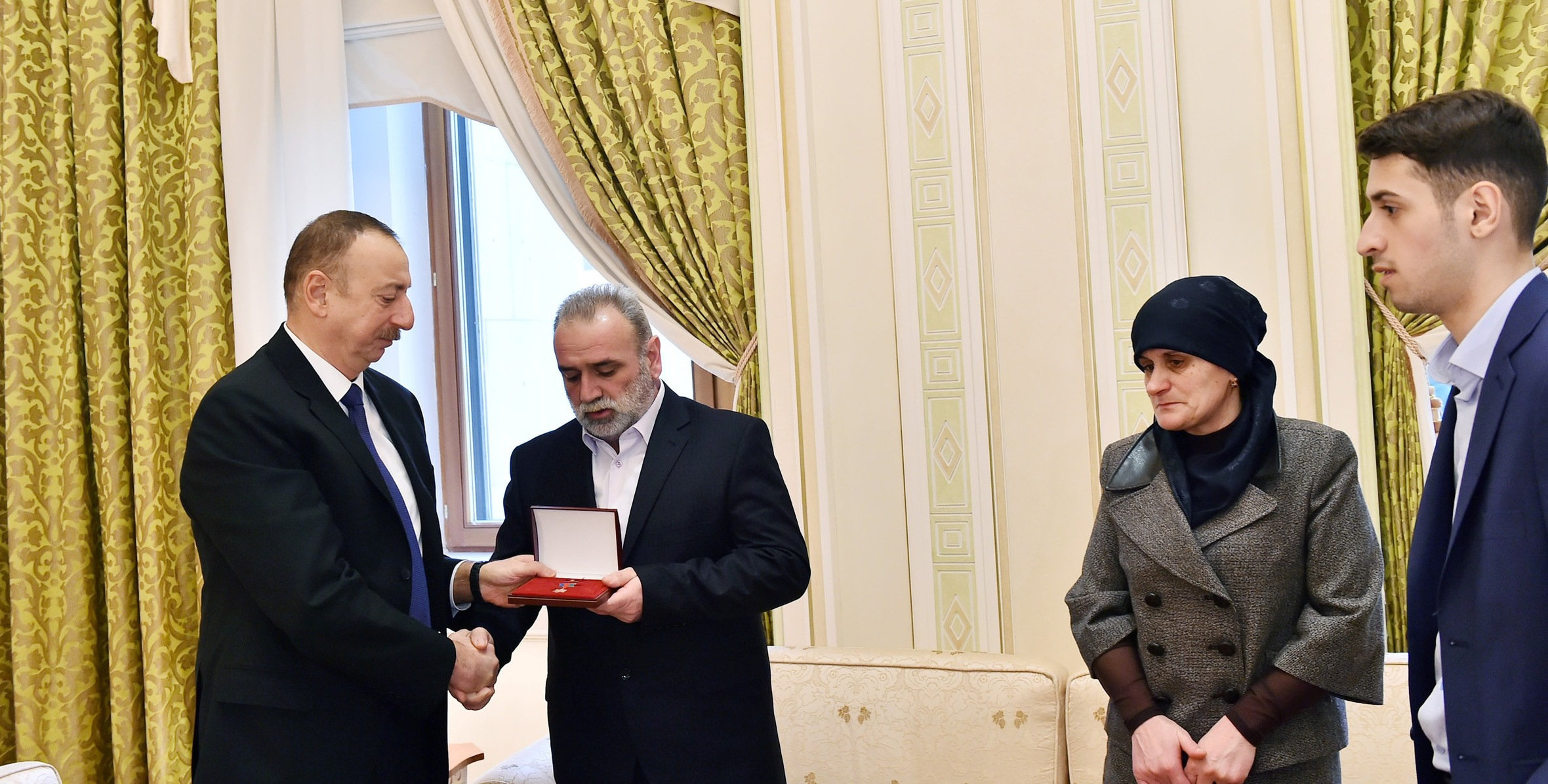
Ilham Aliyev met with the family members of National Hero of Azerbaijan Chingiz Gurbanov

- — National Hero of Azerbaijan and Gold Star Medal (2017)

== See also ==
- Nagorno-Karabakh conflict
- List of National Heroes of Azerbaijan
