= Gurbanova =

Gurbanova (Azerbaijani: Qurbanova) is a feminine surname of Azerbaijani origin. The masculine surname counterpart would be Gurbanov. People with this name include:

- Anna Gurbanova (born 1986), Azerbaijani rhythmic gymnast
- Hokuma Gurbanova (1913–1988), Azerbaijani and Soviet theatre and film actress
- Nargiz Gurbanova (born 1975), Azerbaijani diplomat, serving as the Ambassador of Azerbaijan to Poland
