= Ali Mammadov =

Azerbaijani National Hero (1955–1992)

Alii Mammadli
- Born: 11 August 1955; Nakhchivan, Nakhchivan AR, Azerbaijan SSR
- Died: 1 October 1992 (aged 37); Lachin, Lachin Rayon, Azerbaijan
- Burial place: Baku, Azerbaijan
- Occupation: Police Captain
- Awards: National Hero of Azerbaijan

Ali Huseyn oglu Mammadov (Azerbaijani: Əli Hüseyn oğlu Məmmədov) (11 August 1955 – 1 October 1992) - National Hero of Azerbaijan was born on August 11, 1955, in the Nakhchivan city of Nakhchivan Autonomous Republic of Azerbaijan.

== Life ==
During his youth, his parents moved to Baku where he received his secondary education at School No. 255. In 1975, he passed his military service in Hungary. In 1982, he entered the Police Academy. He worked as a police captain within the Department of Criminal Investigation.

== In Battles ==
Since 1992, Ali Mammadov started to go to the front. On September 24, 1992, he began to fight in the Lachin Rayon. He and other fighters which had captured the Gyzarty height and were subjected to a strong attack in the early morning on October 1, 1992. While bringing out wounded to a safe place, and fighting in the center of the battle, Ali was severely wounded in the head and died at the battlefield.

== Family ==
He was married and had two children.

== Awards ==
He was posthumously awarded the title of the National Hero of Azerbaijan by the decree # 273 of the president of Azerbaijan Republic on 19 October 1992.

He was buried in the Alley of Martyrs in Baku.

One of the streets of Baku is named after Ali Mammadov.
