= Armudlu, Qakh =

Armudlu
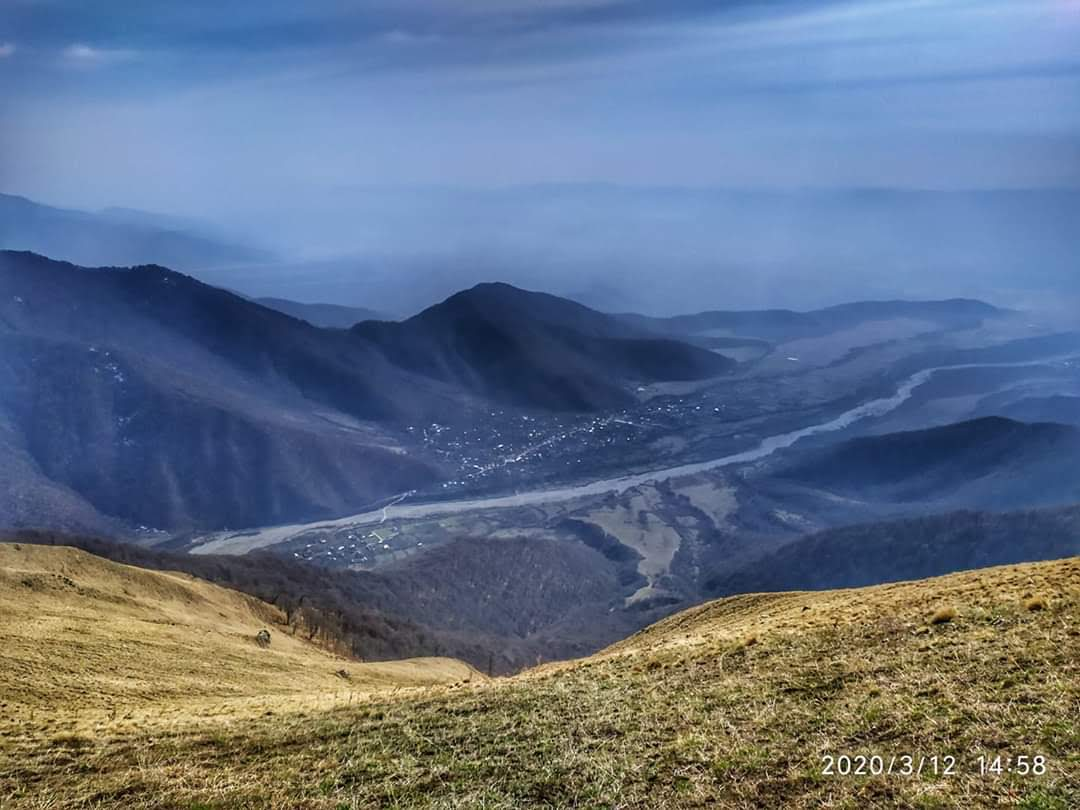

- Location within Azerbaijan Location within Shaki-Zagatala Economic Region
- Coordinates: 41°22′46″N 47°02′14″E
- Country: Azerbaijan
- Rayon: Qakh
- Municipality: Qaşqaçay
- Time zone: UTC+4 (AZT)
  - Summer (DST): UTC+5 (AZT)

Armudlu (also, Armutlu) is a village in the Qakh Rayon of Azerbaijan. The village forms part of the municipality of Qaşqaçay.
