= Ayıtala =

Village in Azerbaijan

Coordinates: 40°33′N 45°48′E

Ayıtala is a village in the municipality of Düzyurd in the Gadabay District of Azerbaijan.

According to a 2009 census, the population of the village was 336.
