= Şınıx =

- Municipality
- Location within Azerbaijan
- Coordinates: 40°41′15″N 45°25′44″E
- Country: Azerbaijan
- Rayon: Gadabay

Population
  - Total: 917
- Time zone: UTC+4 (AZT)
  - Summer (DST): UTC+5 (AZT)

Şınıx (also, Shinykh and Shynykh) is a village and municipality in the Gadabay Rayon of Azerbaijan. It has a population of 917. The municipality consists of the villages of Şınıx and Kollu.

== History ==
During the First Nagorno-Karabakh War, the Gadabey region was divided into two zones, of which Shinikh Zone was the more westerly, initially cut off from the Gadabay Zone due to the militarised Armenian enclave of Artsvashen which straddled the route. Armenians referred to the zone as "Little Karabakh" and on 31 January 1991, Armenian militants killed six Azerbaijanis on the road between Artsvashen and Shinikh.

On 5 August 1992, Armenian military units attacked the zone with around a thousand troops, 4 tanks, 14 armored vehicles and other equipment, resulting in the temporary capture of Mutudərə and Qasımağalı hamlets, but the zone was recaptured rapidly by a regiment led by celebrated local colonel Cahangir Rüstəmov (1939-1994). Şınıx itself suffered no civilian casualties.
