= Kollu, Gadabay =

Village in Şınıx, Gadabay Rayon, Azerbaijan

Kollu is a village in the municipality of Şınıx, in the Gadabay Rayon of Azerbaijan.
