= Qasımağalı =

Gasymaghaly
- Azerbaijani: Qasımağalı
- Location within Azerbaijan
- Coordinates: 40°38′N 45°26′E
- Country: Azerbaijan
- District: Gadabay
- Municipality: Isaly
- Time zone: UTC+4 (AZT)
  - Summer (DST): UTC+5 (AZT)

Qasımağalı (also Gasymaghaly) is a village in the Gadabay District of Azerbaijan. The village forms part of the municipality of Isaly.

The main occupation of the population is agriculture-farming, livestock and animal husbandry.

The name Kasimagali means belonging to Gasim Agha.
