= Qaşqaçay, Qakh =

Qaşqaçay
- Municipality
- Location within Azerbaijan Location within Shaki-Zagatala Economic Region
- Coordinates: 41°23′24″N 47°02′33″E
- Country: Azerbaijan
- Rayon: Qakh

Population
  - Total: 1,495
- Time zone: UTC+4 (AZT)
  - Summer (DST): UTC+5 (AZT)

Qaşqaçay (also, Kashkachay) is a village and municipality in the Qakh Rayon of Azerbaijan. It has a population of 1,495. The municipality consists of the villages of Qaşqaçay, Ashagı Malakh and Armudlu.

== Notable natives ==
- Javanshir Rahimov — National Hero of Azerbaijan.

== See also ==
- Gashgachay (river)
