= Motudərə =

Village in Gadabay, Azerbaijan

Mutudere
- Azerbaijani: Mutudərə
- Location within Azerbaijan
- Coordinates: 40°36′N 45°28′E
- Country: Azerbaijan
- District: Gadabay
- Municipality: Isaly
- Time zone: UTC+4 (AZT)
  - Summer (DST): UTC+5 (AZT)

Mutudərə (also, Mutudere, Mutudara and Motudərə) is a village in the Gadabay District of Azerbaijan. The village forms part of the municipality of Isaly.

Mutudərə was a very important strategic point during the Karabakh war, a target for Armenian incursions and site of a major battle on 6 August 1992. In defence of the village, Azerbaijani national hero Mazahir Rustamov sacrificed his life. The village was eventually reclaimed under the leadership of Colonel Jahangir Rustamov (Cahangir Rüstəmov) and the hamlet remained in Azerbaijani hands thereafter.
