= Qaşqaçay, Dashkasan =

Qaşqaçay
- Location within Azerbaijan
- Coordinates: 40°25′N 45°55′E
- Country: Azerbaijan
- Rayon: Dashkasan
- Time zone: UTC+4 (AZT)
  - Summer (DST): UTC+5 (AZT)

Qaşqaçay (also, Kashkachay) is a village in the Dashkasan Rayon of Azerbaijan. The area holds rich copper reserves whose mining concession was awarded for 30 years to a Turkish company, Artvin Madan, part of the Cengiz Holding conglomerate. The contract signing ceremony was held in September 2021.
