= Düzyurd =

- Municipality
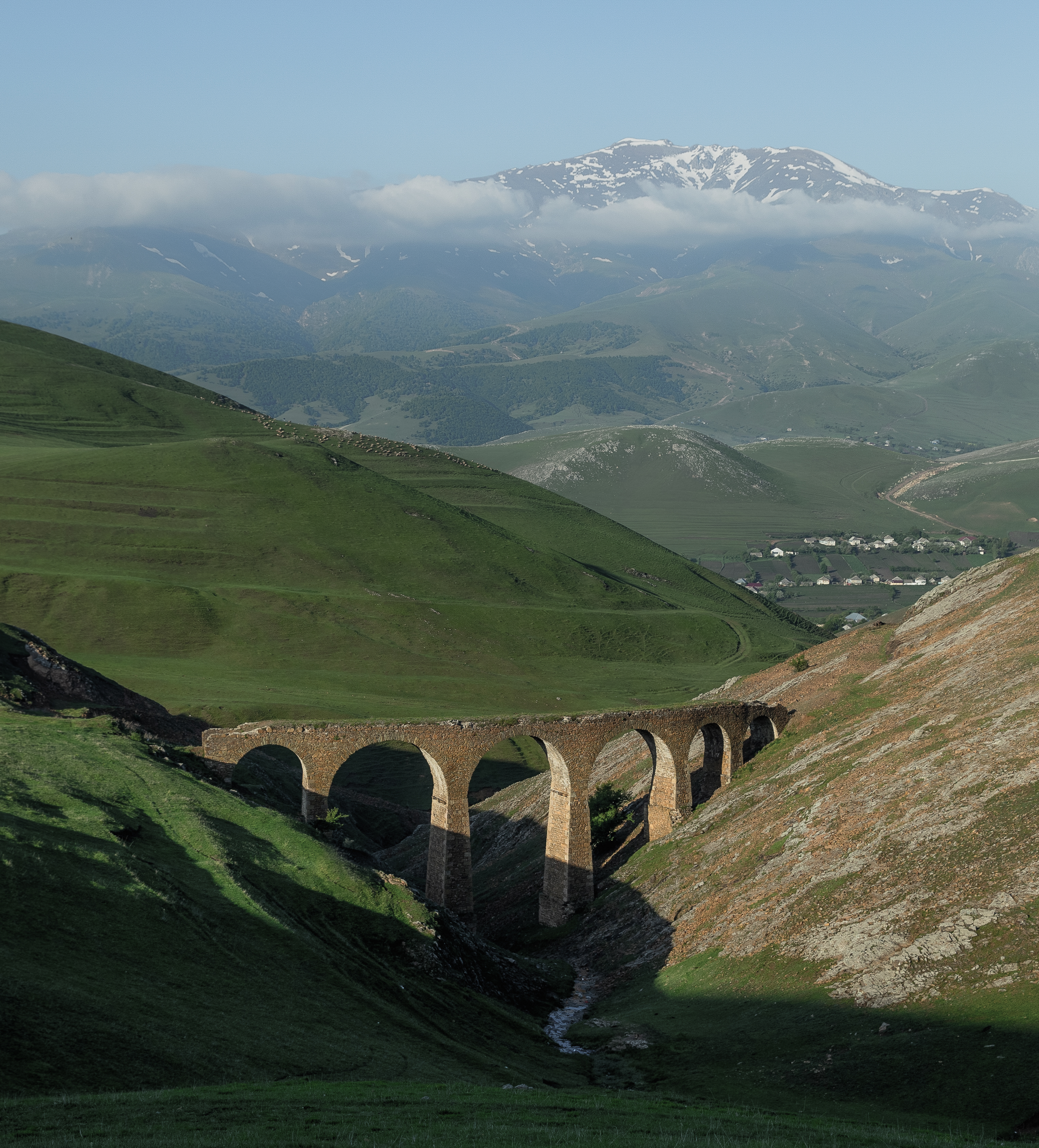

- Location within Azerbaijan
- Coordinates: 40°32′36″N 45°46′32″E
- Country: Azerbaijan
- Rayon: Gadabay

Population
  - Total: 2,091
- Time zone: UTC+4 (AZT)
  - Summer (DST): UTC+5 (AZT)

Düzyurd (also, Dyuzyurd and Dyuz-Yurt) is a village and municipality in the Gadabay Rayon of Azerbaijan. It has a population of 2,091. The municipality consists of the villages of Düzyurd and Ayıtala. The village was founded as an Orthodox Russian settlement named Rozalionovka in the second half of the nineteenth century. The original settlers left the village in 1918, having sold their property to the inhabitants of the neighbouring villages of Gərgər and Dəllər.
