= Azerbaijan–Belarus relations =

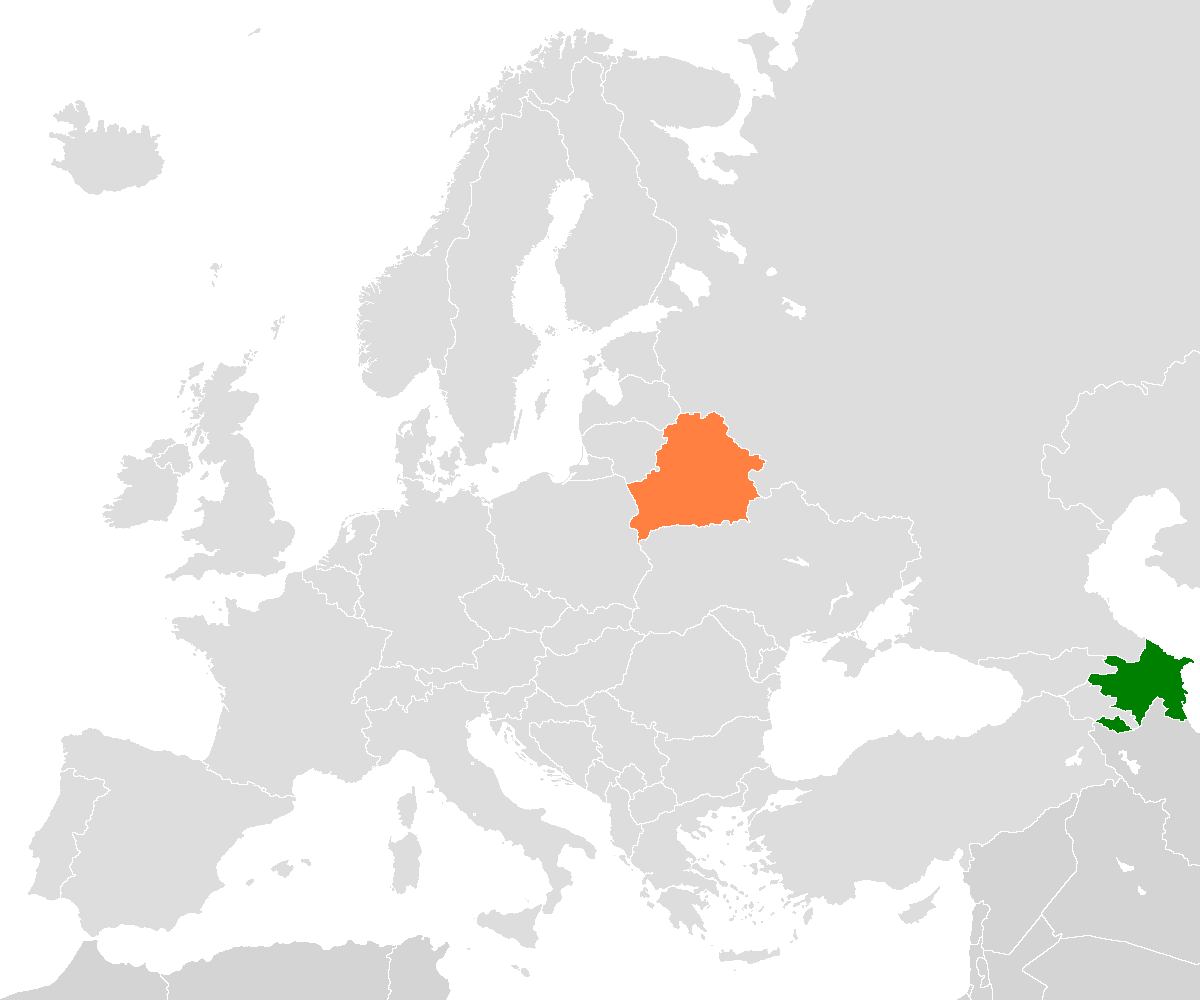

- Azerbaijan: Belarus

Both countries were part of the Russian Empire until 1918 and before 1991, they were part of the Soviet Union. Azerbaijan has an embassy in Minsk and Belarus has an embassy in Baku. Both countries are full members of the Organization for Security and Co-operation in Europe (OSCE) and the Commonwealth of Independent States (CIS). Azerbaijan is a full member of the Council of Europe, Belarus is a candidate. Both Azerbaijan and Belarus are full members of the Non-Aligned Movement (NAM). There are more than 6,000 Azerbaijanis living in Belarus.

== Recent political relations ==
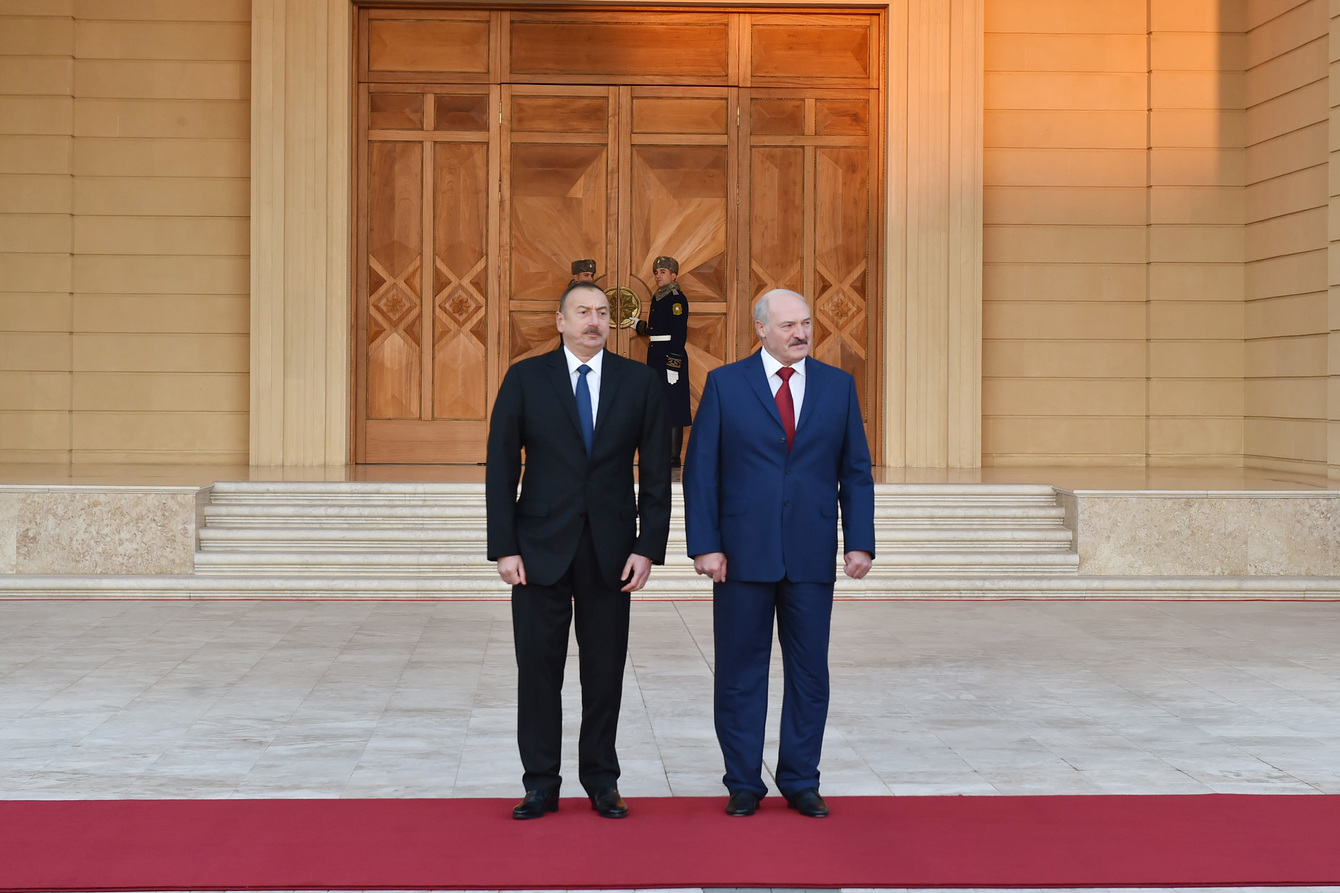
Ilham Aliyev with Alexander Lukashenko in Baku.

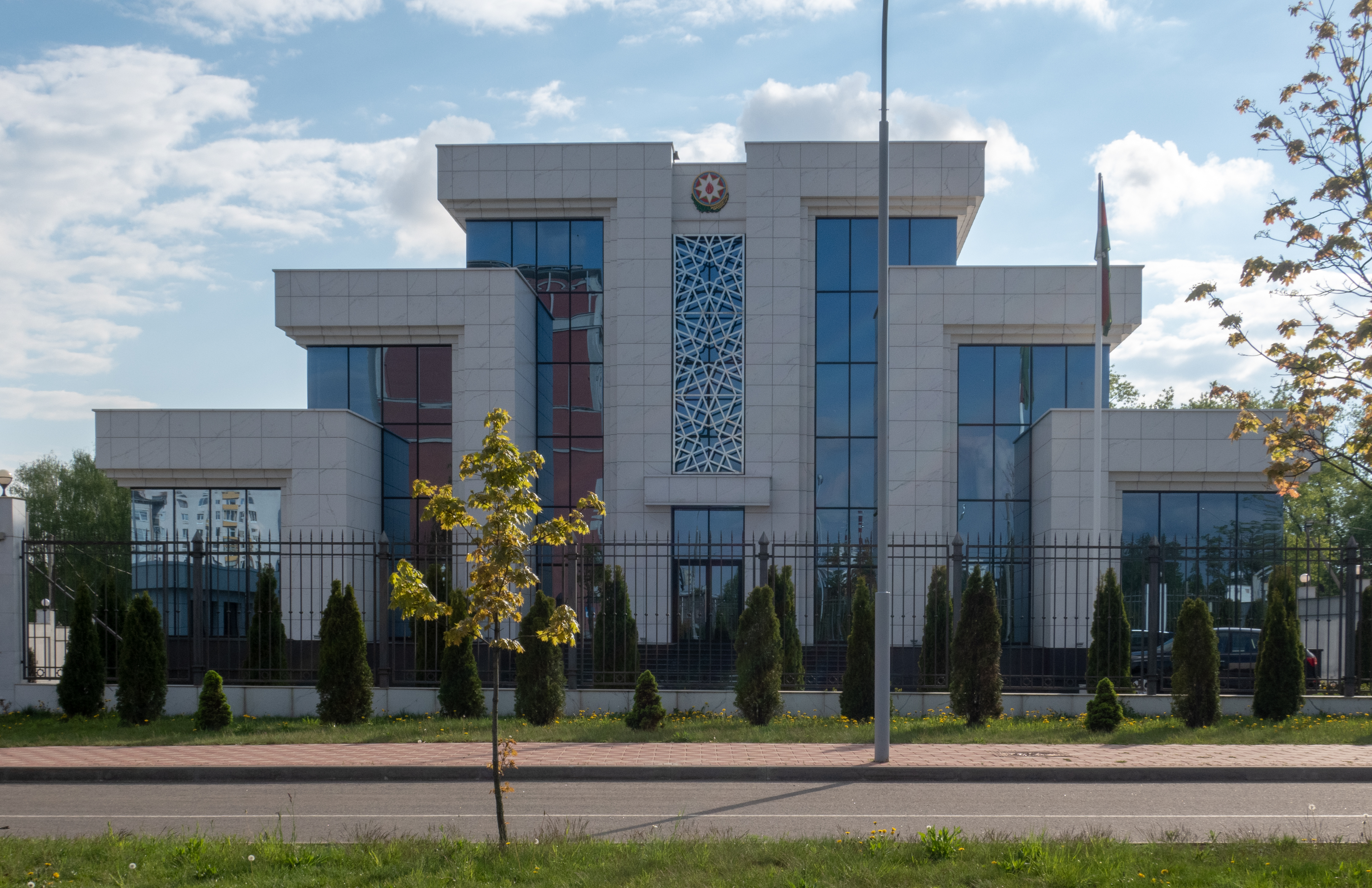
Embassy of Azerbaijan in Minsk

Diplomatic relations between two republics established in 1993 but two countries started to get close during past decade. President of Azerbaijan Ilham Aliyev paid a visit to Belarus on October 17–18, 2006 which was the first high level visit of Azerbaijan. During the visit nine bilateral documents were signed. Lukashenko also paid a visit to Baku and met with Prime Minister of Azerbaijan Artur Rasizade, he visited Heydar Aliyev Foundation, and took part in the official opening ceremony of the national exhibition of Belarus in Azerbaijan.

=== The Nagorno-Karabakh conflict ===
Belarus does not recognize The Nagorno-Karabakh Republic. Alexander Lukashenko have stated that Belarus takes a neutral side on this conflict between Armenia and Azerbaijan and supports peaceful resolution. However, some Belarusian political experts claim that Belarus is "clearly siding" with Azerbaijan and supports Azerbaijan's position.

== Economic relations ==
The Agreement on socio-economic cooperation is the main document defining the perspectives of bilateral relations between the Azerbaijan and Belarus for the period up to 2015. Between 2008 and 2010, Belarus-Azerbaijan trade grew from US$100 m to US$146 m. More important than this moderate increase is the fact that Belarus enjoys a trade surplus, which helps to counteract its immense foreign trade deficit.

Azerbaijan is also helping Belarus to acquire alternative oil sources. Minsk recently began importing oil from Venezuela but direct shipments to landlocked Belarus are difficult. Baku thus agreed to swap schemes by which Minsk gains access to Azerbaijani oil in exchange for Venezuelan oil. By mid-July, the Mozyr refinery in Belarus is scheduled to start processing significant volumes of oil from Azerbaijan on a regular basis. Test shipments of Azerbaijani oil have been ongoing since February through Ukraine's Odesa-Brody pipeline and the Brody-Mozyr section of the Druzhba pipeline.

== Military cooperation ==
The acceleration of the relations between Defense Ministries of both countries is in the interest of both sides. Azerbaijan has been described as largest weapons buyer of Belarus. On 14 November 2008, Belarus and Azerbaijan signed an agreement on military cooperation.

According to a joint journalistic investigation by the Buro Media, Hetq and OCCRP, during the Second Nagorno-Karabakh War, Azerbaijan shot down Armenian drones with the Pechora-2TM air defense system, purchased from the private Belarusian arms manufacturer Tetraedr.

== Cultural area ==
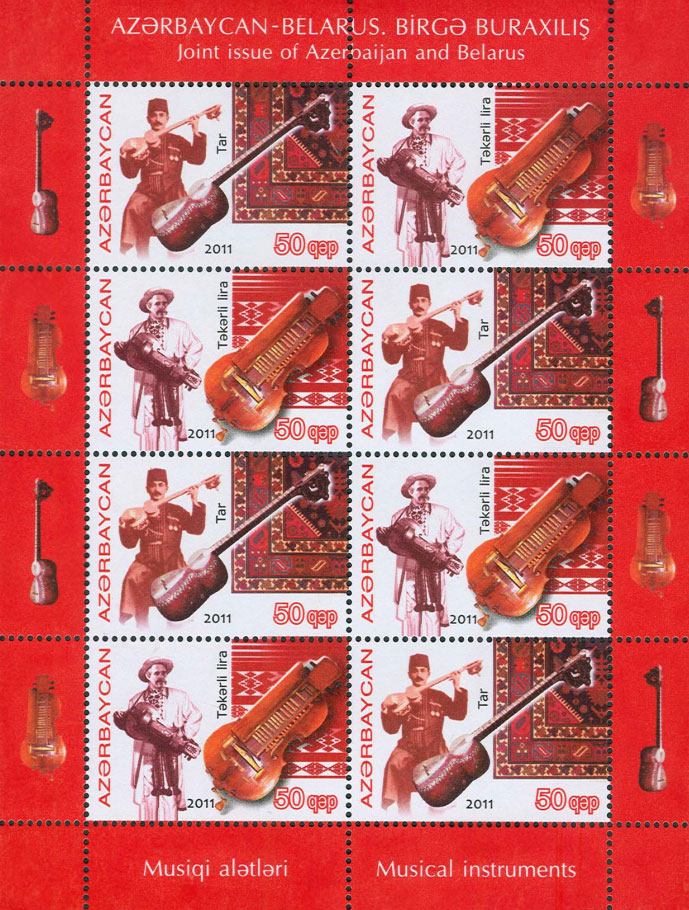
Commemorative stamps produced by Azerbaijan. Musical instruments.

Cultural relations are at stable level. On May 22–24, 2007 Azerbaijan Culture Days were held in Minsk and Bobruysk. However, current level of relations in tourism and education remains as weak.

== Resident diplomatic missions ==
- Azerbaijan has an embassy in Minsk.
- Belarus has an embassy in Baku.

== See also ==
- Foreign relations of Azerbaijan
- Foreign relations of Belarus
