= Qarahəsənli, Agstafa =

Qarahəsənli
- Municipality
- Location within Azerbaijan
- Coordinates: 41°08′N 45°23′E
- Country: Azerbaijan
- District: Aghstafa

Population
  - Total: 1,267
- Time zone: UTC+4 (AZT)
  - Summer (DST): UTC+5 (AZT)

Qarahəsənli (also, Garahasanli and Garahasanly) is a village and municipality in the Aghstafa District of Azerbaijan. It has a population of 1,267. The municipality consists of the villages of Qarahəsənli and Mollacəfərli.
