= Javanshir Rahimov =

- Javanshir İzzat oglu Rahimov
- Javanshir Rahimov - National Hero of Azerbaijan
- Born: June 5, 1973; Qaşqaçay, Qakh, Azerbaijan SSR, Soviet Union
- Died: August 6, 1992 (aged 19); Qasapet, Mardakert District (NKAO)
- Military career
- Allegiance: Republic of Azerbaijan
- Service years: 1992–1992
- Conflicts: First Nagorno-Karabakh War
- Awards: National Hero of Azerbaijan; 1992

Javanshir Izzat oglu Rahimov (Azerbaijani: Cavanşir İzzət oğlu Rəhimov; June 5, 1973 – August 6, 1992) was an Azerbaijani soldier and the National Hero of Azerbaijan.

== Early years ==
Rahimov was born in Qaşqaçay, Qakh. When he was one year old his family moved to Baku, Qaraçuxur. He finished secondary school No. 104 in Suraxanı raion.

== Military service ==
In April 1992, Javanshir Rahimov entered active military service. He became an onboard shooter on Military helicopters. He expressed his desire to go to war as a volunteer and was assigned to a MI-24 Helicopter.

=== Nagorno Karabakh War ===
On August 6, 1992, on his second flight of the day he was wounded. Rahimov insisted that he was ready for flight and flew again. This time their helicopter was shot down by missile fire from Armenian forces.

He was posthumously awarded the title of the National Hero of Azerbaijan on 14 September 1992, by the decree № 204 of the President of Azerbaijan Republic.

== See also ==
- First Nagorno-Karabakh War
- List of National Heroes of Azerbaijan

== Sources ==
- Vugar Asgarov. Azərbaycanın Milli Qəhrəmanları (Yenidən işlənmiş II nəşr). Bakı: "Dərələyəz-M", 2010, səh. 241.
