= Gudrat Gurbanov =

Azerbaijani politician

Gudrat Gurbanov Qüdrət Qurbanov

Chief of State Maritime Administration of Azerbaijan Republic
- Incumbent
- Assumed office April 21, 2006
- President: Ilham Aliyev

Personal details
- Born: Azerbaijan

Military service
- Rank: Captain

Gudrat Gurbanov Ganbar oglu (Azerbaijani: Qüdrət Qurbanov Qənbər oğlu) is an Azerbaijani politician who serves as the Chief of State Maritime Administration of Azerbaijan Republic.

== Political career ==
Gurbanov was appointed the Chief of State Maritime Administration on April 21, 2006 when the agency was established by the President Ilham Aliyev. Since taking the office, he has increased the capabilities of the Azerbaijani maritime transportation. An modernization of surveillance activities in the Azerbaijani sector of the Caspian Sea has also been instituted by setting control over navigation through the Remote Monitoring and Control System in early 2010. In cooperation with State Border Service, Gurbanov also helped modernize the maritime security in the Azerbaijani sector of the sea for protection of borders and objects of national importance.

== See also ==
- Cabinet of Azerbaijan
