= İsalı =

Isaly
- Municipality
- Azerbaijani: İsalı
- Location within Azerbaijan
- Coordinates: 40°37′50″N 45°25′27″E
- Country: Azerbaijan
- District: Gadabay

Population
  - Total: 1,073
- Time zone: UTC+4 (AZT)
  - Summer (DST): UTC+5 (AZT)

İsalı (also, Isaly) is a village and municipality in the Gadabay District of Azerbaijan. It has a population of 1,073. The municipality consists of the villages of Isaly, Gasymaghaly, Dordlar, Mutudere, and Jujanly.
