= Kusapat =

Kusapat / Chiragly Կուսապատ / Çıraqlı
- Çıraqlı
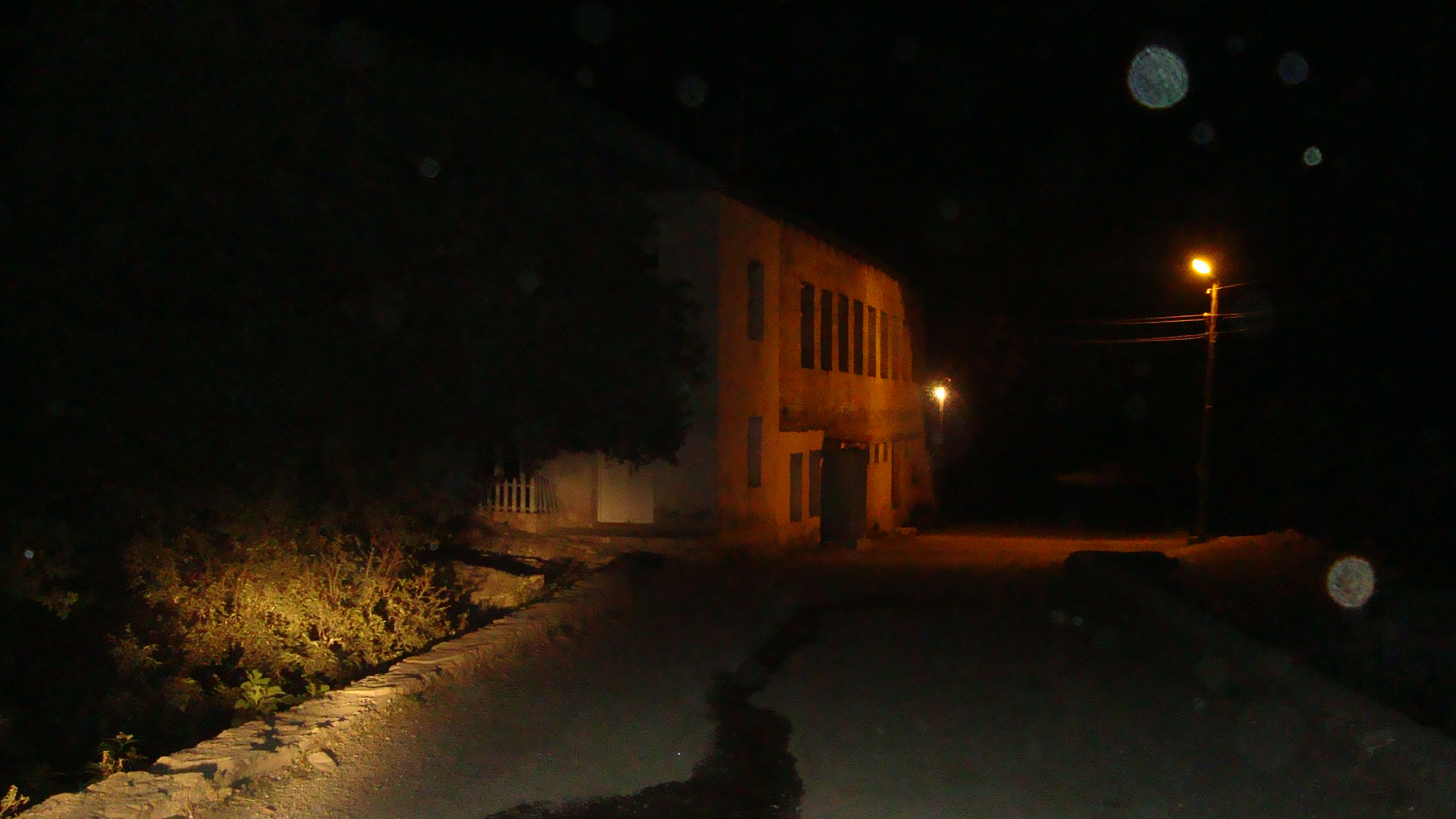

- Location within Azerbaijan
- Coordinates: 40°10′36″N 46°43′51″E
- Country: Azerbaijan
  - District: Aghdara
- Elevation: 776 m (2,546 ft)

Population (2015)
  - Total: 259
- Time zone: UTC+4 (AZT)

Kusapat (Armenian: Կուսապատ; Azerbaijani: Qasapet) or Chiragly (Azerbaijani: Çıraqlı) is a village in the Aghdara District of Azerbaijan, in the region of Nagorno-Karabakh. Until 2023 it was controlled by the breakaway Republic of Artsakh. The village had an ethnic Armenian-majority population until the expulsion of the Armenian population of Nagorno-Karabakh by Azerbaijan following the 2023 Azerbaijani offensive in Nagorno-Karabakh.

== Etymology ==
There are different accounts with regard to the origin of the name "Kusapat". In one account the village takes its name from the Armenian word "Kisapat" (Armenian: Կիսապատ) meaning "half wall" or "semi-walled", which has its origin in a story of a devout bricklayer building a church in the village, but after finding out that its inhabitants intended to pay him for his work, he left, leaving the church half-built. In another account, the village takes its name from a convent named "Kuysapat" near the village.

== History ==
Kusapat was founded in the 15th century by Armenian Prince Atabek Hasan-Jalalyan, the fifth son of Prince Jalal III of the Atabekian dynastic branch of the House of Hasan-Jalalyan, when Karabakh was under Persian domination. Atabek won the favor of a Persian sovereign, and was permitted to return and settle in his homeland at a place of his choosing in the territories between the rivers of Tartar and Khachen. With continuous attacks by Lezgins and Tatars and after two military campaigns headed by Agha Mohammad Khan Qajar being conducted in the area, Kusapat and surrounding villages were left deserted by the late 18th century. One of the descendants of Atabek, Melik-Vani Atabekyan (Armenian: Մելիք-Վանի Աթաբեկյան), assisted the Russians in their war against the Persians during the Russo-Persian War (1804–1813) and later rebuilt the village together with families originally from Kusapat. Later, Melik-Vani Atabekyan also founded or restored six other settlements in the area: Mets Shen, Mokhratagh, Maghavuz, Varnkatagh, Vardadzor, and Chankatagh.

During the Soviet period, the village was a part of the Mardakert District of the Nagorno-Karabakh Autonomous Oblast.

Kusapat was badly damaged during the First Nagorno-Karabakh War. On 7 July 1992 the village was captured and destroyed by the Azerbaijani Army. On 16 July 1992, it was recaptured by Artsakh.

== Historical heritage sites ==
Historical heritage sites in and around the village include the church of Surb Astvatsatsin (Armenian: Սուրբ Աստվածածին, lit. 'Holy Mother of God') built in 1269, a 12th/13th-century khachkar, the medieval Martyr's Shrine (Armenian: Նահատակ սրբատեղի, romanized: Nahatak Srbateghi), a medieval cemetery, and the 18th-century Melik-Israyelyan Fortress (Armenian: Մելիք-Իսրայելյանների ամրոց, romanized: Melik-Israyelyanneri Amrots).

== Economy and culture ==
The population is mainly engaged in agriculture and animal husbandry. As of 2015, the village has a municipal building, a secondary school, two shops, and a medical centre.

== Demographics ==
The village had 276 inhabitants in 2005, and 259 inhabitants in 2015. Historically, there has been a Greek presence in the village as well as in the neighboring village of Mehmana.

== Gallery ==
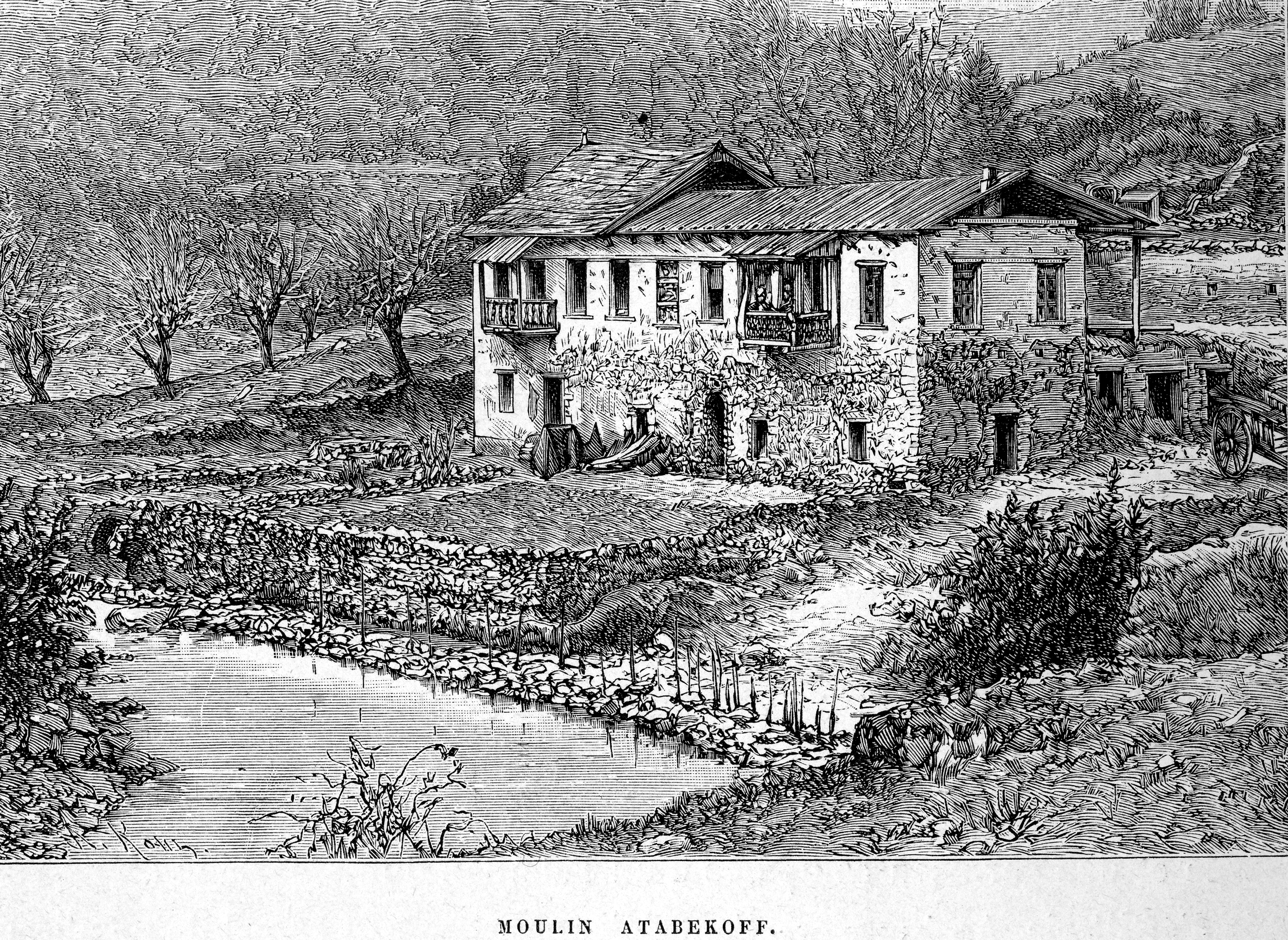
One of the 11 mills of the Atabekians in Kusapat

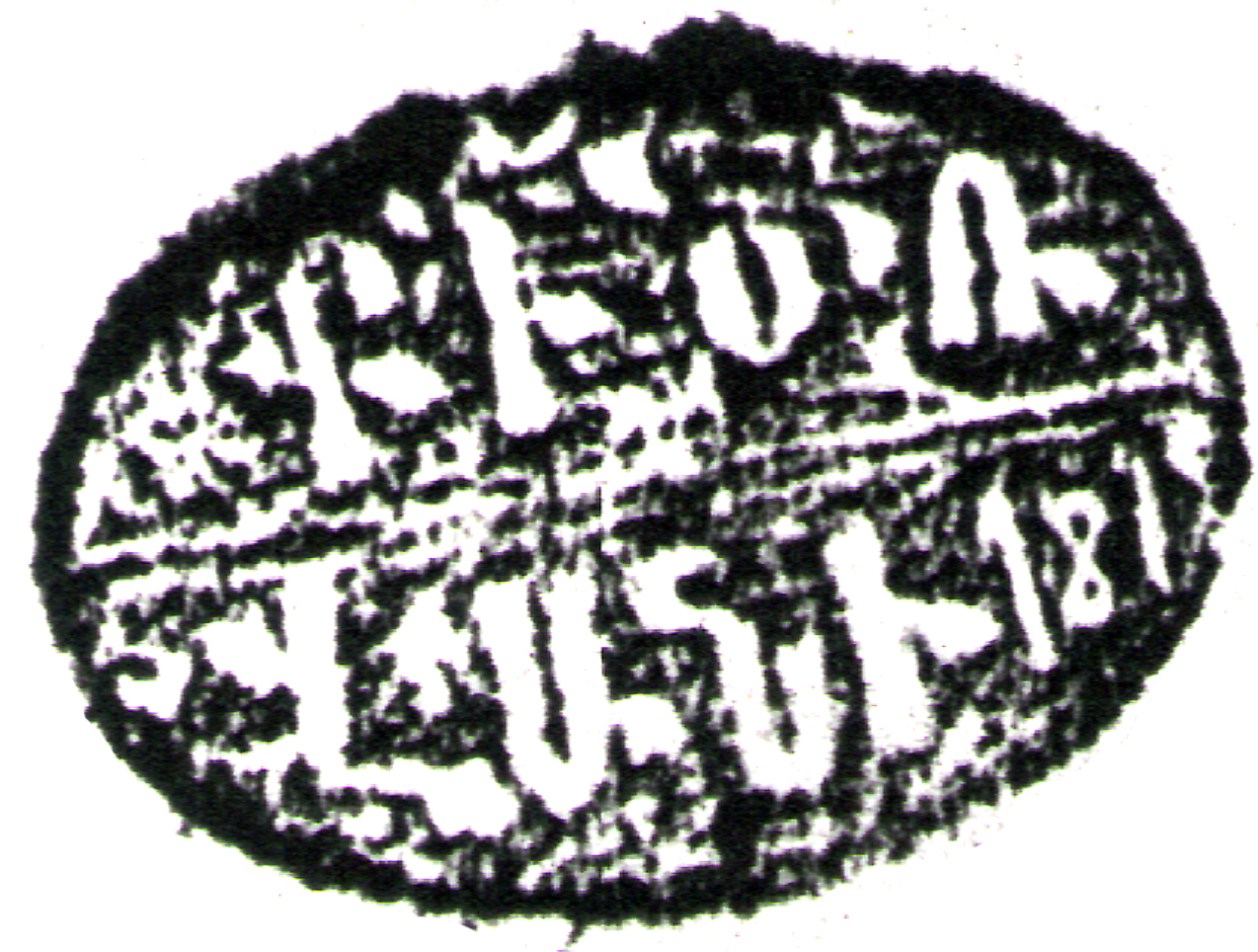
Seal of Melik-Vani Atabekyan, Lord of Jraberd
