= Qarahəsənli, Nakhchivan =

Qarahəsənli
- Municipality
- Location within Azerbaijan
- Coordinates: 39°28′N 44°58′E
- Country: Azerbaijan
- Autonomous republic: Nakhchivan
- District: Sharur

Population (2005)
  - Total: 737
- Time zone: UTC+4 (AZT)

Qarahəsənli (also, Garahasanli and Garahasanly) is a village and municipality in the Sharur District of Nakhchivan, Azerbaijan. It is located 10 km away from the district center, on the bank of the Arpachay River. Its population is busy with grain-growing, vegetable-growing, farming, foddering and animal husbandry. There are secondary school, cultural house, library and a medical center in the village. It has a population of 737.

== Etymology ==
The village's name is pronounced as Qarasannı in the local dialect. The names are considered as the ethno toponym. In the 1940s, the three settlements in named Karasan were registered in the Crimea.

== Notable natives ==
- Kerim Kerimov — National Hero of Azerbaijan.
