= Əliağalı =

- Location within Azerbaijan Location within Karabakh Economic Region
- Coordinates: 40°02′18″N 46°46′34″E
- Country: Azerbaijan
- District: Agdam

Population (2015)
  - Total: 275
- Time zone: UTC+4 (AZT)

Əliağalı (Aliaghaly) is a village in the Agdam District of Azerbaijan.

== History ==
The village was located in the Armenian-occupied territories surrounding Nagorno-Karabakh, coming under the control of ethnic Armenian forces during the First Nagorno-Karabakh War in the early 1990s. The village subsequently became part of the breakaway Republic of Artsakh as part of its Martakert Province, where it was known as Hovtashen (Armenian: Հովտաշեն). It was returned to Azerbaijan as part of the 2020 Nagorno-Karabakh ceasefire agreement.

== Historical heritage sites ==
Historical heritage sites in and around the village include a burial mound from the 2nd–1st millennia BCE, and a tomb from the early Middle Ages.

== Notable people ==
- Nadir Aliyev – National Hero of Azerbaijan.
