= Vardadzor, Martakert =

Vardadzor / Gulyatag Վարդաձոր / Gülyataq
- Location within Azerbaijan
- Coordinates: 40°08′52″N 46°44′41.4″E
- Country: Azerbaijan
  - District: Aghdara

Population (2015)
  - Total: 199
- Time zone: UTC+4 (AZT)

Vardadzor (Armenian: Վարդաձոր) or Gulyatag (Azerbaijani: Gülyataq; Armenian: Գյուլաթաղ, romanized: Gyulatagh) is a village that is located in the Aghdara District of Azerbaijan, in the region of Nagorno-Karabakh. Until 2023 it was controlled by the breakaway Republic of Artsakh. The village had an ethnic Armenian-majority population until the expulsion of the Armenian population of Nagorno-Karabakh by Azerbaijan following the 2023 Azerbaijani offensive in Nagorno-Karabakh.

== History ==
During the Soviet period, the village was part of the Mardakert District of the Nagorno-Karabakh Autonomous Oblast.

== Historical heritage sites ==
Historical heritage sites in and around the village include the 12th/13th-century St. Joseph's Church (Armenian: Սուրբ Հովսեփ եկեղեցի, romanized: Surb Hovsep Yekeghetsi), a 12th/13th-century cemetery, and the Melik-Alaverdyan Fortress (Armenian: Մելիք-Ալավերդյանների ամրոց, romanized: Melik-Alaverdyanneri Amrots) built in 1799.

== Economy and culture ==
The population is mainly engaged in mining, agriculture, and animal husbandry. As of 2015, the village has a municipal building, a school, two shops, and a medical centre.

== Demographics ==
The village had 193 inhabitants in 2005, and 199 inhabitants in 2015.
