= Gold Star Medal (Azerbaijan) =

Award given to a National Hero of Azerbaijan

Gold Star Medal "Qızıl Ulduz" medalı
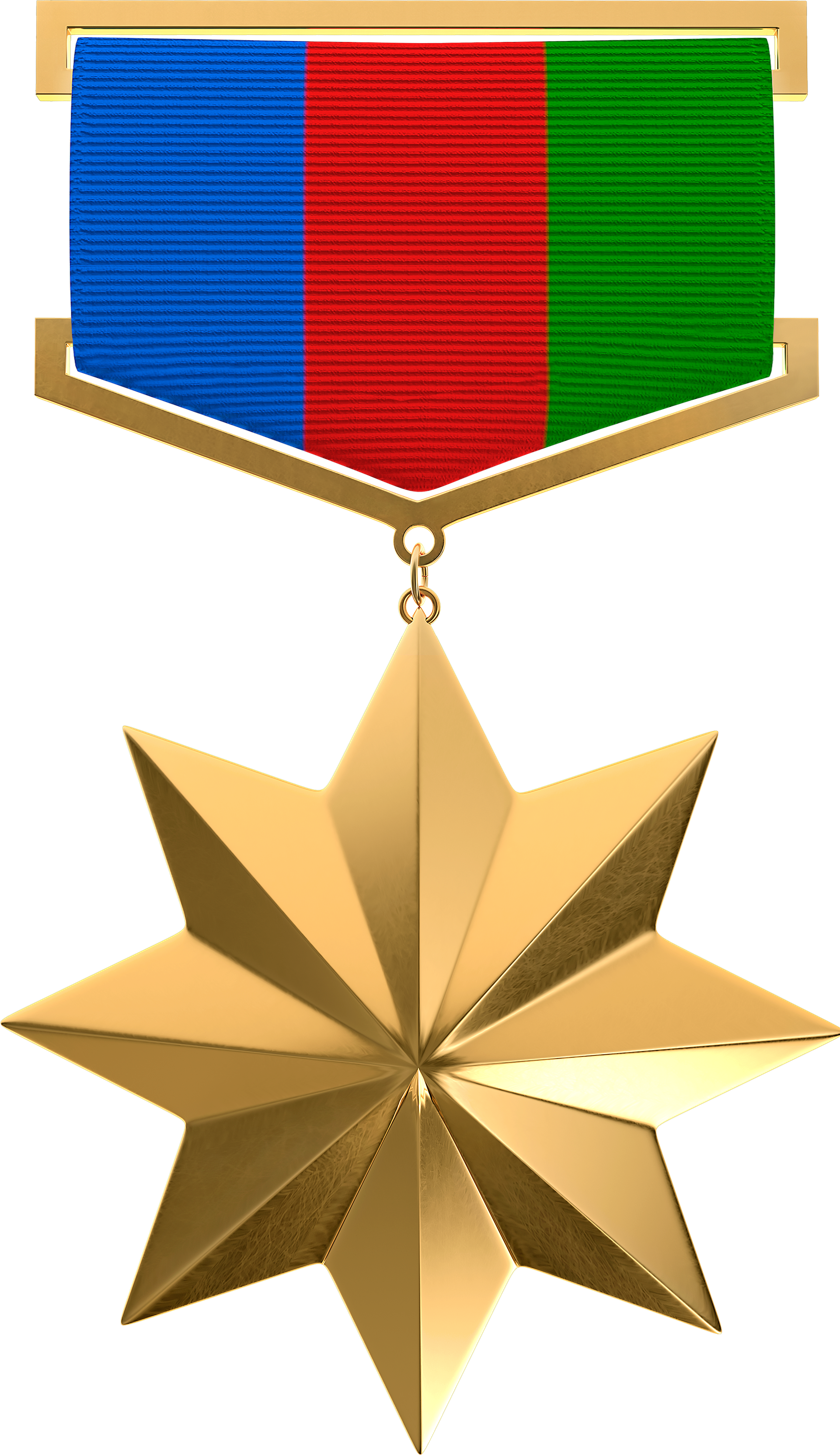
- Type: Individual Award
- Awarded for: Bravery and courage shown in defense of the sovereignty and territorial integrity of Azerbaijan Republic, protection of the world population.
- Country: Azerbaijan
- Presented by: President of Azerbaijan
- Eligibility: Azerbaijani government's civilian personnel, citizens and non-citizens, foreign civilians
- Clasps: 1
- Status: Active
- Established: March 25, 1992. Decree No. 201
- First award: June 7, 1992

Precedence
- Next (higher): Hero of the Patriotic War Medal

The Gold Star Medal (Azerbaijani: "Qızıl Ulduz" medalı, IPA: [gɯˌzɯɫ ʊɫˌduz medɑˈɫɯ]) is an award that honours a National Hero of Azerbaijan.

The award was established by Abulfaz Elchibey (the former President of Azerbaijan) on March 25, 1992 (by Decree No. 201). This award is conferred for bravery and courage shown in defense of the sovereignty, the territorial integrity of the Republic of Azerbaijan and for the protection of its civil population.

== History ==
=== Original form ===
The medal was initially in the form of a gold-filled crescent facing to the right that enclosed an eight-pointed star with flat dihedral rays on the front face.

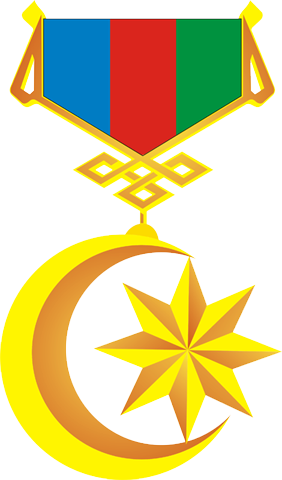
"Ay-Ulduz" (Crescent and star) medal

The rear side of the medal has a flat surface and is bound with a thin fillet going along the cutout. An inscription with the letters "National Hero of Azerbaijan" is located on the rear side. Two one mm shapes are on the upper edge of the medal. A ring connects the crescent to four connected rhomboids attached to a gold-filled pentagonal plate 20 mm in height and 26 mm in width, framed by a fillet along the perimeter. Two slits are found on the sides of the block. It is mostly covered with a tricolor moiré ribbon in the colors of the flag of Azerbaijan. Its total weight is 21.5 grams. According to Decree No. 429, the Qizil Ulduz medal was issued to commemorate a "National Hero of Azerbaijan" after making modifications and additions to the former Decree.

== Description ==
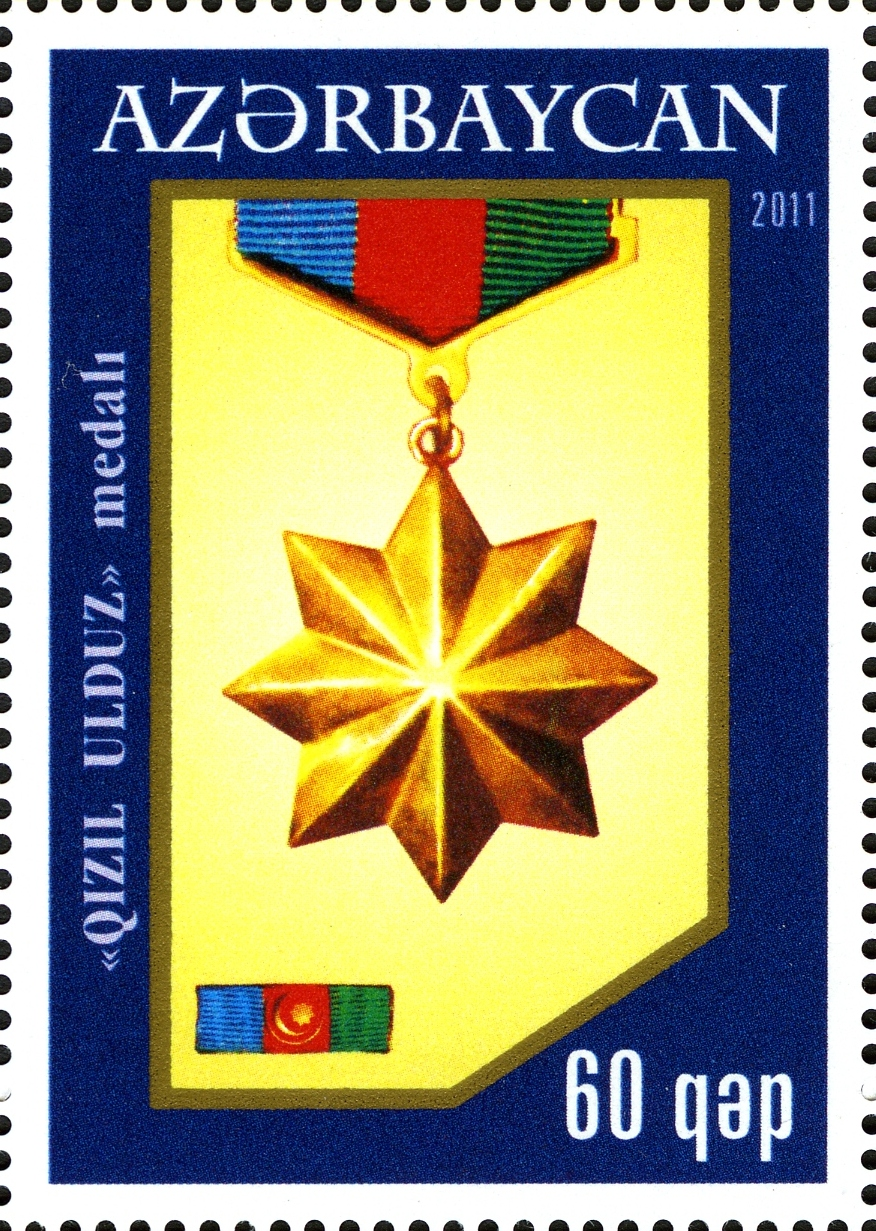
The medal on the stamp of Azerbaijan, 2011

The Qizil Ulduz medal is an eight-pointed star with flat dihedral rays 31.5 mm in diameter, attached to a pentagonal plate, which is bordered by a 28 by 20 mm fillet along the perimeter, with two eye rings. The inner side of the plate is covered with moiré ribbon, the colors of which correspond to the flag of Azerbaijan. The inscription "Azərbaycanın Milli Qəhrəman" is in the center of the rear side of the medal. A serial number is etched on the upper ray of the medal. The medal is pinned to the left side of the chest above other decorations and medals.
