= National Hero of Azerbaijan =

Azerbaijani title

National Hero of Azerbaijan Azərbaycan Milli Qəhrəmanı
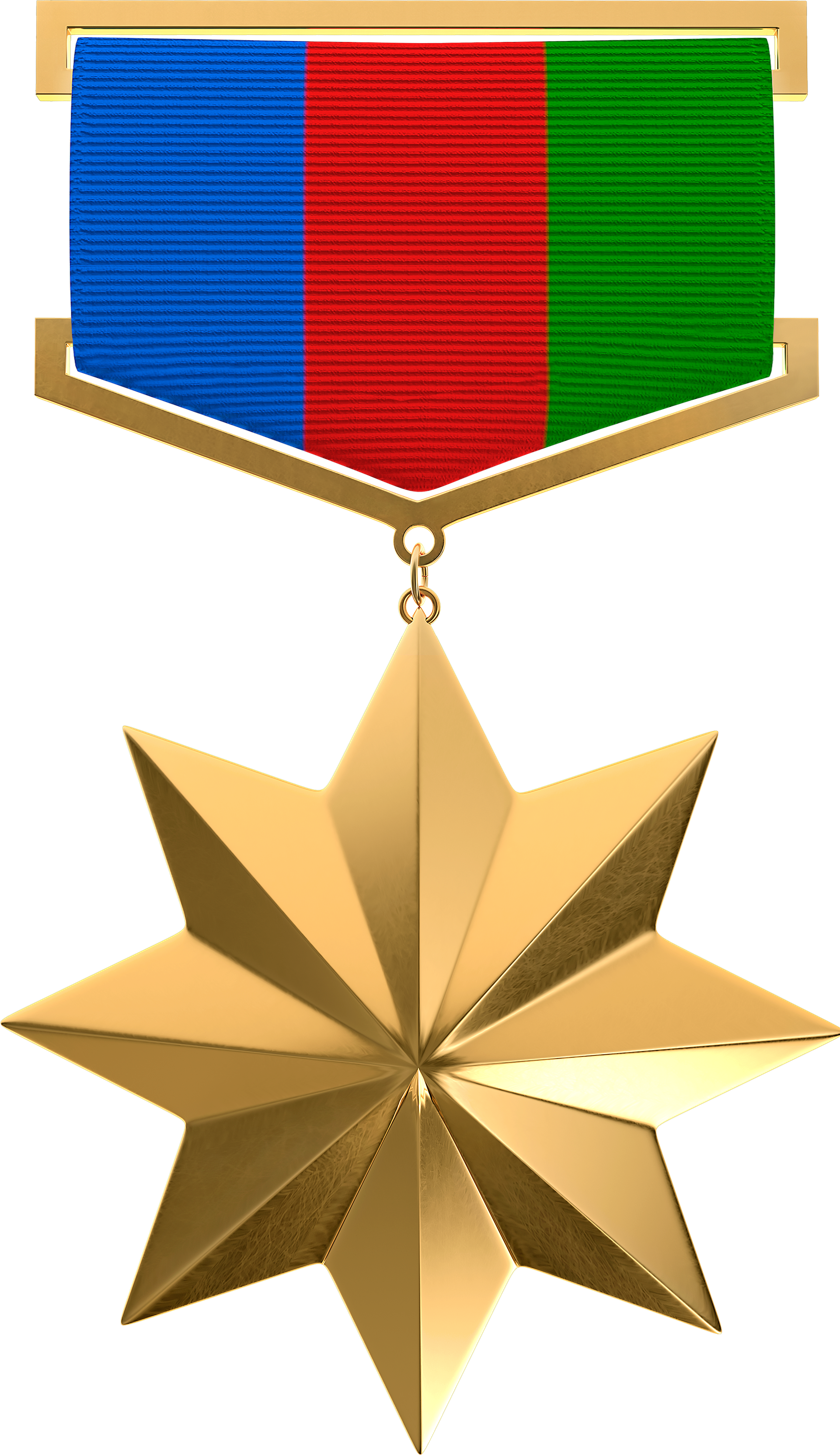
- Gold Star Medal of the National Hero
- Type: Individual Award
- Awarded for: Exceptional service and courage for the independence and prosperity of people of the Republic of Azerbaijan.
- Country: Azerbaijan
- Presented by: President of Azerbaijan
- Eligibility: Azerbaijani citizens
- Clasps: 1
- Status: Active
- Established: 25 March 1992. Decree No. 201
- First award: 7 June 1992

Precedence
- Next (higher): Hero of the Patriotic War

The National Hero of Azerbaijan (Azerbaijani: Azərbaycan milli qəhrəmanı) is the highest national title in the Republic of Azerbaijan. The title was named on 25 March 1992, and the "Qizil Ulduz" Medal awarded as a sign of receiving this title was established by a separate law on 15 July 1992. The law on the title has been in effect since 25 December 1995. It can only be awarded once to the same person.

The title is awarded for outstanding services of national importance to Azerbaijan in defence and strengthening of the state system and creation of important national values.

== Recipients ==
- Mubariz Ibrahimov
- Maharram Seyidov
- Albert Agarunov
- Kerim Kerimov
- Riad Ahmadov
- Amiraslan Aliyev
- Ali Mammadov
- Emin Aliyev
- Mirasgar Seyidov
- Ibrahim Mammadov
- Igor Kshnyakin
- Mikayil Jabrayilov
- Nadir Aliyev
- Salatyn Asgarova
- Sayavush Hasanov
- Allahverdi Baghirov
- Faig Jafarov
- Eldar Mammadov
- Bahruz Mansurov
- Chingiz Mustafayev
- Ali Mustafayev
- Asif Maharramov
- Alif Hajiyev
- Agil Guliyev
- Shahin Taghiyev
- Yusif Mirzayev
- Zakir Majidov
- Ruslan Polovinko
- Javanshir Rahimov
- Murad Mirzayev
- Shukur Hamidov
- Samid Imanov
- Mazahir Rustamov
- Chingiz Gurbanov
- Anvar Arazov
- Anatoly Davidovich
- Isgender Aznaurov
- Aytakin Mammadov
- Ilham Aliyev
