= Deaths in August 1992 =

The following is a list of notable deaths in August 1992.

Entries for each day are listed alphabetically by surname. A typical entry lists information in the following sequence:

- Name, age, country of citizenship at birth, subsequent country of citizenship (if applicable), reason for notability, cause of death (if known), and reference.

== August 1992 ==
=== 1 ===
- Margarita Aliger, 76, Russian writer.
- Alfred "Chico" Alvarez, 72, Canadian trumpeter.
- Bob Peak, 65, American illustrator.
- Eivind Rekustad, 43, Norwegian weightlifter and Olympian (1972).
- Aleksey Konstantinovich Ryazanov, 72, Soviet flying ace and war hero during World War II.

=== 2 ===
- Michel Berger, 44, French singer-songwriter, heart attack.
- Tom W. Blackburn, 79, American author, screenwriter and lyricist.
- Alf Cleverley, 84, New Zealand boxer and Olympian (1928).
- Oscar Hagberg, 83, American football player and coach.
- Ephraim Katz, 60, Israeli-American filmmaker and writer, emphysema.
- Igor Vladimirovich Makeyev, 20, Azerbaijani soldier, killed in battle.
- Thomas Brennan Nolan, 91, American geologist.
- John Simerson, 57, American gridiron football player.
- Jim Weatherall, 62, American football player (Philadelphia Eagles, Washington Redskins, Detroit Lions).

=== 3 ===
- Ebbe Carlsson, 44, Swedish journalist and publisher, AIDS-related complications.
- Fereydoun Farrokhzad, 53, Iranian entertainer, humanitarian, and dissident, murdered.
- Bror Hellström, 77, Swedish Olympic runner (1936).
- Wang Hongwen, 56, Chinese politician, liver cancer.
- Don Lang, 67, English trombonist and singer, cancer.
- E. Hansford McCourt, 83, American politician.
- Nicanor Costa Méndez, 69, Argentine diplomat.
- Tetsu Nakamura, 83, Japanese film actor and opera singer.
- Eddie Riska, 72, American basketball player.

=== 4 ===
- Ralph Cooper, 84, American actor and screenwriter, cancer.
- Norm King, 73, Australian politician.
- Sam Loucks, 77, American basketball player.
- Seichō Matsumoto, 82, Japanese author.
- František Tomášek, 93, Czech Roman Catholic cardinal.
- Buzz Trebotich, 71, American football player (Detroit Lions).

=== 5 ===
- Juan David García Bacca, 91, Spanish-Venezuelan philosopher.
- Tante Leen, 80, Dutch levenslied singer.
- Jim Marquis, 91, American baseball player (New York Yankees).
- Robert Muldoon, 70, New Zealand politician, prime minister (1975–1984).
- Achyut Patwardhan, 87, Indian independence activist and politician.
- Jeff Porcaro, 38, American drummer (Toto), heart attack.
- Bhagat Puran Singh, 88, Indian writer, environmentalist, and philanthropist.
- Lefty Wilkie, 77, Canadian-American baseball player (Pittsburgh Pirates).

=== 6 ===
- Beyler Agayev, 23, Azerbaijani soldier and war hero, killed in action.
- Leszek Błażyński, 43, Polish Olympic boxer (1972, 1976), suicide.
- Heinrich Eckstein, 85, German politician.
- Frank Jerwa, 83, Polish-Canadian ice hockey left winger (Boston Bruins, St. Louis Eagles).
- Zakir Majidov, 36, Azerbaijani soldier, helicopter crash.
- Ruslan Polovinko, 22, Ukrainian-Azerbaijani helicopter pilot, helicopter crash.
- Javanshir Rahimov, 19, Azerbaijani soldier, helicopter crash.
- Mazahir Rustamov, 32, Azerbaijani soldier and war hero, killed in action.
- Massimo Salvadori, 84, British-Italian historian and anti-fascist.

=== 7 ===
- Alakbar Aliyev, 36, Azerbaijani soldier and war hero, killed in action.
- John Anderson, 69, American actor (Psycho, Eight Men Out, MacGyver), heart attack.
- Aslan Qabil oğlu Atakişiyev, 38, Azerbaijani officer and war hero, killed in action.
- Pablo Cumo, 94, Argentine actor.
- Mariusz Dmochowski, 61, Polish actor.
- Chris Lamborn, 76, Australian rules footballer.
- Moma Marković, 79, Serbian communist politician.
- Francisco Fernández Ordóñez, 62, Spanish politician, cancer.
- Bill Ripper, 79, Australian rules footballer.
- Sándor Szabó, 51, Hungarian fencer and Olympian (1964, 1968, 1972).
- Berthold Teusner, 85, Australian politician.

=== 8 ===
- Abu al-Qasim al-Khoei, 92, Iranian Marja'.
- Ivan Anikeyev, 59, Soviet cosmonaut, cancer.
- Alison Gertz, 26, American AIDS activist, AIDS.
- Mohan Jayamaha, 43, Sri Lankan naval admiral, landmine explosion.
- Denzil Kobbekaduwa, 52, Sri Lankan lieutenant general, landmine explosion.
- John Kordic, 27, Canadian ice hockey player (Montreal Canadiens, Toronto Maple Leafs, Washington Capitals), drug overdose.
- Egisto Macchi, 64, Italian composer.
- Thomas J. McIntyre, 77, American politician, member of the U.S. Senate (1962–1979).
- Bertalan Papp, 78, Hungarian Olympic fencer (1948, 1952).
- Vijaya Wimalaratne, 51, Sri Lankan general, landmine explosion.

=== 9 ===
- Sukhdev Singh Babbar, 37, Indian Sikh militant, shot.
- Francisco Carrere, 79, Argentine Olympic equestrian (1948).
- Patrick Devlin, Baron Devlin, 86, British judge.
- Manuel Ulloa Elias, 69, Peruvian politician and economist.
- Blaž Kraljević, 44, Bosnian soldier, shot.
- David Llewellyn, 76, British politician and junior minister.
- Bill Russell, 87, American composer.
- Frederick Shick, 78, American Olympic sailor (1936).
- H. W. Whillock, 88, American politician.

=== 10 ===
- Shimon Agranat, 85, Israeli jurist.
- Aribert Heim, 78, Austrian SS doctor and war criminal during World War II, colorectal cancer.
- Kurt A. Körber, 82, German businessman.
- Joe Krejci, 86, American football player (Chicago Cardinals).
- Paride Romagnoli, 83, Italian Olympic wrestler (1936).
- Adrienne J. Smith, 58, American psychologist, cancer.
- S. P. P. Thorat, 85, Indian Army officer.

=== 11 ===
- James R. Allen, 66, United States Air Force general, cancer.
- Dorsey B. Hardeman, 89, American politician.
- Mario Nigro, 75, Italian painter.
- Bernard Ramm, 76, Canadian theologian.

=== 12 ===
- Eduardo Anguita, 77, Chilean poet.
- John Cage, 79, American composer, stroke.
- Paolo Caccia Dominioni, 96, Italian soldier and resistance fighter during World War II.
- Kenji Nakagami, 46, Japanese novelist and essayist, kidney cancer.
- James Ellsworth Noland, 72, American judge and politician, member of the U.S. House of Representatives (1949–1951).
- James W. Payne, 62, American set decorator (The Sting, Slap Shot, The Love Boat), Oscar winner (1974).
- Patricia Harmsworth, Viscountess Rothermere, 63, English actress and socialite, heart attack.
- Henry A. Schade, 91, American Navy officer and naval architect.

=== 13 ===
- Clifford Allison, 27, American racing driver, racing crash.
- Bets Dekens, 85, Dutch Olympic discus thrower (1928).
- Jan Elburg, 72, Dutch poet.
- David Kaplan, 44-45, American journalist and news producer, shot.

=== 14 ===
- Harry Allen, 80, English executioner.
- Deane Kincaide, 81, American jazz musician.
- Marcel Le Glay, 72, French historian and archaeologist.
- Masinde Muliro, 70, Kenyan politician.
- Norah Phillips, Baroness Phillips, 82, British politician.
- Senthamarai, 57, Indian actor.
- John Sirica, 88, American judge, cardiac arrest.
- Tony Williams, 64, American singer (The Platters), emphysema.

=== 15 ===
- Jackie Edwards, 53-54, Jamaican musician, heart attack.
- Oran Frazier, 83, American baseball player.
- Linda Laubenstein, 45, American physician, heart attack.
- Ron Malo, 56, American audio engineer.
- Michel Medinger Sr., 83, Luxembourgian Olympic long-distance runner (1936).
- Giorgio Perlasca, 82, Italian businessman and anti-fascist, heart attack.

=== 16 ===
- Malcolm Atterbury, 85, American actor (The Birds, Apple's Way, Emperor of the North).
- Ida Degrande, 82, Belgian Olympic middle-distance runner (1928).
- Jean Fidon, 86, French footballer.
- Mark Heard, 40, American musician, cardiac arrest.
- Robert E. Miles, 67, American white supremacist theologist religious leader.
- Yvonne Simon, 81, French racing driver.
- Karl Storch, 78, German hammer thrower and Olympic medalist (1952).
- Antoni Wieczorek, 68, Polish ski jumper and Olympian (1952), traffic collision.

=== 17 ===
- Jéhan Le Roy, 68, French Olympic equestrian (1960, 1964).
- Barbara Morgan, 92, American photographer.
- John Maclay, 1st Viscount Muirshiel, 86, British politician.
- Stretch Murphy, 85, American Hall of Fame basketball player.
- Tom Nolan, 71, Irish politician.
- Tommy Nutter, 49, British fashion designer, AIDS.
- Al Parker, 40, American pornographic actor, producer, and director, AIDS-related complications.
- Tecla San Andres Ziga, 85, Filipino politician.
- Stanley Woodward, 93, American envoy and ambassador.

=== 18 ===
- Lachlan Cameron, 83, Australian rules footballer.
- Simon Hartog, 52, British filmmaker, leukaemia.
- Aatos Hirvisalo, 76, Finnish Olympic sailor (1948).
- Chris McCandless, 24, American adventurer, starvation, poisoning.
- Sixten Ringbom, 57, Finnish art historian.
- John Sturges, 82, American film director (The Magnificent Seven, The Great Escape, Bad Day at Black Rock), heart attack, heart failure.

=== 19 ===
- Jean Accart, 80, French flying ace during World War II.
- Clyde D. Eddleman, 90, American general.
- Jean-Albert Grégoire, 93, French racing driver and engineer.
- Jean Hubeau, 75, French pianist, composer and pedagogue.
- Drahomír Koudelka, 46, Czech Olympic volleyball player (1968, 1972, 1976).
- Norvel Lee, 67, American Olympic boxer (1952), pancreatic cancer.
- George McIlraith, 84, Canadian politician.
- Carsten Winger, 85, Norwegian actor.

=== 20 ===
- Eliezer Berkovits, 83, Romanian-American theologian and rabbi.
- Walter Grabmann, 86, German flying ace during World War II.
- Walter Lincoln Hawkins, 81, American chemist and engineer.
- Alex McKenzie, 95, New Zealand sharebroker and politician.
- Jack Nuttall, 63, Australian rules footballer.
- Liu Zhen, 77, Chinese general.

=== 21 ===
- Theodor Berger, 87, Austrian composer.
- Henning Jensen, 82, Danish footballer.
- Harry Kaskey, 90, American Olympic speed skater (1924).
- Isidro Lángara, 80, Spanish football player.
- Arturo Martínez, 74, Mexican film actor and director.
- Zühtü Müridoğlu, 86, Turkish sculptor.
- Dai Vernon, 98, Canadian magician.
- Mike Wise, 28, American gridiron football player (Los Angeles Raiders, Cleveland Browns), suicide.

=== 22 ===
- Mark E. Andrews, 88, American oil executive, complications following a stroke.
- Hedley Blackmore, 91, Australian rules footballer.
- Hallowell Davis, 95, American physiologist and otolaryngologist.
- Paul A. Dodd, 90, American educator and economist.
- Flit Holliday, 78, American baseball player.
- Gerald Ketchum, 83, American naval officer.
- Ljubomir Kokeza, 72, Croatian football player.
- Ruslan Muradov, 19, Azerbaijani soldier and war hero, killed in action.

=== 23 ===
- David Hallifax, 64, British naval officer, ALS.
- Joe Marconi, 58, American gridiron football player (Los Angeles Rams, Chicago Bears), leukemia.
- Charles August Nichols, 81, American animator and film director.
- Ricardo Romero, 93, Chilean Olympic fencer (1936).
- Cyril Rushton, 69, Australian politician.
- Virginia Sale, 93, American actress, heart failure.
- Donald Stewart, 71, Scottish politician.
- Lee Tevis, 71, American football player.
- N. Veeraswamy, 60, Indian film producer.
- Alf Watson, 85, Australian track and field athlete and Olympian (1928, 1936).
- Jim Young, 76, Irish hurler and Gaelic football player.

=== 24 ===
- Bekor Ashot, 32, Armenian military leader, killed in battle.
- André Donner, 74, Dutch jurist.
- Gordon Goldsmith, 76, Australian rules footballer.
- George Jones, 95, Australian Air Force commander.
- Margie Liszt, 83, American actress, cancer.
- Larrie Londin, 48, American drummer, heart attack.
- Andrei Lupan, 80, Moldovan writer and politician.
- Yunis Najafov, 24, Azerbaijan soldier and war hero, killed in action.
- Tommy Pratt, 86, Australian rules footballer.
- Lazăr Sfera, 83, Romanian football player.

=== 25 ===
- Neil Stanley Crawford, 61, Canadian politician and jazz musician, ALS.
- George R. Nelson, 65, American set decorator (The Godfather Part II, Apocalypse Now, The Right Stuff), Oscar winner (1975).
- Frederick O'Neal, 86, American actor and television director.
- Veikko Peräsalo, 80, Finnish Olympic high jumper (1936).
- Cyril Stanley Smith, 88, British metallurgist and historian of science, cancer.

=== 26 ===
- Ray Adams, 79, American basketball player.
- Arthur Leigh Allen, 58, prime suspect in the Zodiac killings.
- Sammy Benskin, 69, American pianist.
- Bob de Moor, 66, Belgian comic artist.
- Nguyen Thi Dinh, 72, Vietnamese Army general and Vice President.
- Daniel Gorenstein, 69, American mathematician.
- Don Reece, 72, American football player.
- Sammy Timberg, 89, American musician and composer.

=== 27 ===
- Sovqiyar Abdullayev, 23, Azerbaijani soldier and war hero, killed in action.
- Rune Andersson, 73, Swedish Olympic sports shooter (1960).
- Bengt Holbek, 59, Danish folklorist.
- Gonzalo Jiménez, 90, Spanish Olympic water polo player (1928).
- Peter Jørgensen, 85, Danish boxer and Olympic medalist (1932).
- George H. Kerr, 80, American diplomat.
- Daniel K. Ludwig, 95, American shipping businessman.
- Hélène Perdrière, 80, French stage and film actress.
- Max Stiepl, 78, Austrian Olympic speed skater (1936, 1948).

=== 28 ===
- Otar Dadunashvili, 64, Soviet and Georgian cyclist and Olympian (1952).
- Tom Drake-Brockman, 73, Australian politician.
- Danny Guinane, 81, Australian rules footballer.
- Bedwyr Lewis Jones, 59, Welsh scholar, literary critic and linguist.
- Asri Muda, 68, Malaysian politician.
- Basil Smith, 90, Australian rules footballer.
- Tan Qixiang, 81, Chinese geographer and historian.

=== 29 ===
- Andy Gilbert, 78, American baseball player (Boston Red Sox).
- Félix Guattari, 62, French psychoanalyst and philosopher, heart attack.
- Ian Hamilton, 85, New Zealand cricketer.
- Heini Hediger, 83, Swiss biologist.
- John Janisch, 72, American basketball player (Boston Celtics).
- Laurie King, 84, Australian rules footballer.
- Lou Midler, 77, American football player (Minnesota Golden Gophers, Pittsburgh Pirates, Green Bay Packers).
- Mary Norton, 88, English writer (The Borrowers).
- Erling Petersen, 86, Norwegian politician.
- Jo Ann Robinson, 80, American civil rights activist.
- Henricus Rol, 86, Dutch painter.
- Victor H. Schiro, 88, American politician.
- Iuliu Szöcs, 54, Romanian Olympic volleyball player (1964).
- Teddy Turner, 75, English actor (Never the Twain, Emmerdale, All Creatures Great and Small), emphysema.
- Weng Weng, 34, Filipino actor, heart attack.

=== 30 ===
- Claude Barma, 73, French director and screenwriter.
- Karl Bricker, 68, Swiss Olympic cross-country skier (1948, 1952).
- Hideo Gosha, 63, Japanese film director.
- Ernst Ihbe, 78, German cyclist and Olympic champion (1936).
- Margit Kövessi, 84, Hungarian Olympic gymnast (1928).
- Rubén Uriza, 73, Mexican show jumper and Olympic champion (1948).

=== 31 ===
- Chow Shu-kai, 78, Taiwanese politician, Minister of Foreign Affairs (1971–1972).
- Matlab Guliyev, 33, Azerbaijani soldier and war hero, killed in action.
- Wolfgang Güllich, 31, German rock climber, traffic collision.
- Cletus F. O'Donnell, 75, American Roman Catholic prelate.
- John Salathé, 93, Swiss-American rock climber.
- George Leonard Trager, 86, American linguist.
- Charles L. Weltner, 64, American jurist and politician, member of the United States House of Representatives (1963-1967).
- Hans Wimmer, 85, German sculptor.
