= Deaths in March 1992 =

The following is a list of notable deaths in March 1992.

Entries for each day are listed alphabetically by surname. A typical entry lists information in the following sequence:

- Name, age, country of citizenship at birth, subsequent country of citizenship (if applicable), reason for notability, cause of death (if known), and reference.

== March 1992 ==
=== 1 ===
- Marie Déa, 79, French actress, fire accident.
- Bill Heindl Jr., 45, Canadian ice hockey player (Minnesota North Stars, New York Rangers).
- Pierre Maudru, 99, French screenwriter.
- Howard Payne, 60, English Olympic track and field athlete (1964, 1968, 1972).
- Karlo Štajner, 90, Austrian-Yugoslav communist activist and Gulag survivor.

=== 2 ===
- Scott Appleton, 50, American football player, heart failure.
- Martin Camaj, 66, Albanian folklorist, linguist, and writer.
- Robert Clatworthy, 80, American art director (Ship of Fools, Psycho, Guess Who's Coming to Dinner), Oscar winner (1966).
- Sandy Dennis, 54, American actress (Who's Afraid of Virginia Woolf?, The Out of Towners, Any Wednesday), Oscar winner (1967), ovarian cancer.
- Edward Devitt, 80, American district judge and politician, member of the United States House of Representatives (1947-1949).
- Subimal Dutt, 88, Indian diplomat.
- Ron Hardy, 33, American DJ and house music pioneer, AIDS-related illness.
- Eddie Locke, 69, American baseball player.
- Samuel Marx, 90, American film producer, screenwriter and book author.
- Stan Morcom, 56, Australian rules footballer.
- Jackie Mudie, 61, Scottish footballer, cancer.
- Adolfo Sarti, 63, Italian politician.

=== 3 ===
- Robert Beatty, 82, Canadian-English actor (2001: A Space Odyssey, Where Eagles Dare, Labyrinth).
- George Giles, 82, American baseball player.
- Laurent Henric, 86, French football player, coach, and Olympian (1928).
- Lella Lombardi, 50, Italian racing driver, liver cancer.
- Dante Maggio, 83, Italian film actor.
- Harley Parker, 76, Canadian artist and scholar.
- Henry Powell, 84, Australian rules footballer.
- Saara Ranin, 94, Finnish actress.
- Sukumar Sen, 92, Indian linguist.
- G. L. S. Shackle, 88, English economist.
- Henry White, 86, Australian rules footballer.

=== 4 ===
- Néstor Almendros, 61, Spanish cinematographer (Days of Heaven, Kramer vs. Kramer, Sophie's Choice), Oscar winner (1979), AIDS-related lymphoma.
- Art Babbitt, 84, American animator (Snow White and the Seven Dwarfs, Fantasia, Dumbo), kidney failure.
- Joseph Buttinger, 85, American politician.
- Norm Fletcher, 76, Australian rules footballer.
- Alabbas Iskandarov, 33, Azerbaijani soldier and war hero, killed in action.
- Peter Judge, 75, English cricketer.
- Pare Lorentz, 86, American filmmaker, cancer.
- Mary Osborne, 70, American guitarist, leukemia.
- Larry Rosenthal, 81, American baseball player.
- Sándor Veress, 85, Hungarian-Swiss composer.
- Yevgeniy Yevstigneyev, 65, Soviet and Russian actor, heart attack.

=== 5 ===
- Jam Sadiq Ali, 57, Pakistani politician.
- Santos Balmori, 92, Spanish-Mexican painter.
- Peter Hadland Davis, 73, British botanist.
- Karin Hardt, 81, German actress, cerebral hemorrhage.
- Jack Haskett, 80, Australian rules footballer.
- Giuseppe Olmo, 80, Italian road bicycle racer and Olympian (1932).
- Eduardo Airaldi Rivarola, 70, Peruvian basketball player, coach, and referee.
- Andy Samuel, 82, American child actor (Our Gang), cancer.
- Berthold Slupik, 63, German Olympic modern pentathlete (1952).
- Sunder, 83, Indian film actor.
- Frank Trigilio, 73, American football player.
- David Walker, 81, Scottish-Canadian novelist.

=== 6 ===
- Elvia Allman, 87, American actress (The Beverly Hillbillies, Petticoat Junction, The Nutty Professor), pneumonia.
- Alojz Benac, 77, Bosnian and Yugoslav archaeologist and historian.
- Silviu Bindea, 79, Romanian football player and coach.
- Léo Campion, 86, French actor and freemason.
- Maria Helena Vieira da Silva, 83, Portuguese painter.
- Ranjit Desai, 63, Indian marathi writer.
- Hugh Gibb, 76, English drummer, father of the Bee Gees, internal bleeding.
- Ian Hartland, 52, New Zealand cricketer.
- Otto Klineberg, 92, Canadian-American psychologist, Parkinson's disease.
- David Stone Martin, 78, American artist.
- Erik Nordgren, 79, Swedish composer, arranger and bandleader.
- Abdou Noshi, 52, Egyptian Olympic footballer (1960).

=== 7 ===
- Charles Claxton, 88, English anglican prelate.
- Asaf Messerer, 88, Soviet ballet dancer and ballet teacher.
- Gunnar Sträng, 85, Swedish politician.
- Hans Zeisel, 86, Austrian-American sociologist and legal scholar.

=== 8 ===
- Red Callender, 76, American musician, thyroid cancer.
- Paddy Coad, 71, Irish football player and manager.
- Sherman Edwards, 82, American baseball player (Cincinnati Reds).
- Pentti Papinaho, 65, Finnish sculptor.

=== 9 ===
- Menachem Begin, 78, Israeli politician, prime minister (1977–1983), Nobel Prize recipient (1978), heart attack.
- James Brooks, 85, American artist.
- Monty Budwig, 62, American bassist.
- Franco Margola, 83, Italian composer.
- Keris Mas, 69, Malaysian writer, heart attack.
- Felipe Turich, 93, Mexican actor, pneumonia.
- Arthur Van De Vijver, 44, Belgian racing cyclist.

=== 10 ===
- Krasimira Bogdanova, 42, Bulgarian Olympic basketball player (1976, 1980).
- Vladimir Ivković, 62, Yugoslav Olympic water polo player (1952, 1956).
- Wilhelm Rudolf Mann, 97, German factory manager for IG Farben and Bayer during World War II.
- Enrico Mollo, 78, Italian racing cyclist.
- Helmut Reichmann, 50-51, German world champion glider pilot, mid-air collision.
- Ronald Scott-Miller, 87, British politician, MP (1951-1959).
- Luis Usoz, 59, Spanish Olympic field hockey player (1960, 1964).
- Giorgos Zampetas, 67, Greek musician, bone cancer.

=== 11 ===
- László Benedek, 87, Hungarian-American film director (The Wild One, Death of a Salesman, Port of New York).
- Richard Brooks, 79, American film director and screenwriter (Cat on a Hot Tin Roof, Blackboard Jungle, Elmer Gantry), Oscar winner (1961), heart failure.
- Gianni Carrara, 63, Italian Olympic cross-country skier (1956).
- David Carroll, 41, American actor (Grand Hotel), pulmonary embolism.
- Liu Geping, 87, Chinese communist revolutionary and politician.
- Norm Hall, 65, American racecar driver.
- Anton Ingolič, 85, Slovenian novelist.
- Lily May Perry, 97, Canadian-American botanist.
- Eddie Sadowski, 77, American basketball player.
- Joaquín Satrústegui, 82, Spanish politician.
- Roszel Cathcart Thomsen, 91, American district judge (United States District Court for the District of Maryland).

=== 12 ===
- César Barros, 79, Chilean Olympic fencer (1936).
- Girolamo Bortignon, 86, Italian prelate of the Roman Catholic Church.
- Max Catto, 84, English playwright and novelist.
- Aleksandyr Christow, 87, Bulgarian football player and Olympian (1924).
- Harold Hobson, 87, English theatre critic.
- Elgiz Karimov, 21, Azerbaijani soldier and war hero, killed in action.
- Hans G. Kresse, 70, Dutch cartoonist (Eric de Noorman).
- Heinz Kühn, 80, German politician.
- Lucy M. Lewis, 94, Native American potter.
- Salvatore Lima, 64, Italian politician and mafioso, murdered.
- Phyllis Stanley, 77, British actress.
- Aino Talvi, 83, Estonian actress and singer.

=== 13 ===
- Frieda Fronmüller, 90, German lutheran church musician and composer.
- Adolfo Odnoposoff, 75, Argentine cellist.
- Dulce de Souza Lopes Pontes, 77, Brazilian Roman Catholic nun and philanthropist.
- Osvaldo Reig, 62, Argentine biologist and paleontologist.
- Donald W. Riegle, Sr., 74, American politician.

=== 14 ===
- Bill Allum, 75, Canadian ice hockey player and coach.
- Teymur Elchin, 67, Azerbaijani poet and publicist.
- Ralph James, 67, American voice actor (Mork & Mindy, Spider-Man, The Plastic Man Comedy/Adventure Show).
- Glenn Liebhardt, 81, American baseball player (Philadelphia Athletics, St. Louis Browns).
- Steven Brian Pennell, 34, American convicted serial killer, execution by lethal injection.
- Jean Poiret, 65, French actor and playwright, heart attack.
- Barry Roseborough, 59, Canadian football player.
- Alvin Schwartz, 64, American author and journalist, lymphoma.
- Dave Snowden, 94, American baseball player.
- Arthur Studenroth, 92, American Olympic cross country runner (1924).
- Francis Toomey, 88, New Zealand cricketer.
- Elfrida Vipont, 89, English writer of children's literature.

=== 15 ===
- Pietro Bucalossi, 86, Italian physician and politician.
- Helen Deutsch, 85, American screenwriter.
- Allan Dick, 76, New Zealand politician.
- Sergio Guerri, 86, Italian cardinal of the Roman Catholic Church.
- Deane Montgomery, 82, American mathematician specializing in topology.
- Rahi Masoom Raza, 64, Indian poet and writer and Bollywood lyricist.
- Wee Willie Smith, 80, American basketball player.
- Jaap van der Vecht, 85, Dutch entomologist and academic.

=== 16 ===
- Jean Denis, 89, Belgian politician and writer.
- Ron Howell, 56, Canadian football player.
- Roger Lemelin, 72, Canadian writer, lung cancer.
- Wang Renzhong, 75, Chinese political leader.
- Yves Rocard, 88, French nuclear physicist.
- Pyotr Shcherbakov, 62, Soviet film and theater actor.
- Joschi Walter, 66, Austrian football player and Olympian (1952).

=== 17 ===
- Jack Arnold, 75, American film director (Creature from the Black Lagoon, The Incredible Shrinking Man, It Came from Outer Space), arteriosclerosis.
- Frank Carideo, 83, American college football player and coach.
- Aat de Roos, 72, Dutch Olympic field hockey player (1936).
- Manuel Ferreira, 74, Portuguese writer.
- Harald Halvorsen, 93, Norwegian footballer.
- Gøril Havrevold, 77, Norwegian stage and film actress.
- Franklin R. Levy, 43, American film producer (Homeward Bound: The Incredible Journey, My Stepmother Is an Alien, Nighthawks), pulmonary embolism.
- Monika Mann, 81, German author.
- László Orczán, 80, Hungarian Olympic cyclist (1936).
- Grace Stafford, 88, American actress (voice of Woody Woodpecker), spinal cancer
- Erna E. Wetzel, 92, American painter.
- Ron White, 71, Australian rules footballer.

=== 18 ===
- Arnold Diamond, 76, English actor, traffic collision.
- Harry Hubbick, 81, English football player.
- Jack Kelsey, 62, Welsh football goalkeeper.
- Mario Landi, 71, Italian director.
- Antonio Molina, 64, Spanish flamenco dancer, singer and actor.

=== 19 ===
- Cesare Danova, 66, Italian actor (Mean Streets, Cleopatra, Animal House), heart attack.
- Franziska Donner, 91, First Lady of South Korea as wife of president Syngman Rhee.
- Wayne Dumont, 77, American politician.
- Michael Aloysius Feighan, 87, American politician, member of the United States House of Representatives (1943-1971).
- Oscar Gugen, 82, British diver.
- Fred Land, 66, American football player (San Francisco 49ers).
- Marilyn Moore, 61, American jazz singer.
- Cyril O'Brien, 79, Australian rules footballer.
- Ed Prentiss, 83, American radio actor.
- Fergus Yeates, 79, Australian cricketer.

=== 20 ===
- George Whelan Anderson, Jr., 85, American admiral and diplomat.
- Lina Bo Bardi, 77, Italian-Brazilian architect.
- Charles-Édouard Campeau, 75, Canadian politician, member of the House of Commons of Canada (1958-1962).
- Georges Delerue, 67, French film composer (A Little Romance, Platoon, Julia), Oscar winner (1980), heart attack.
- Ioannis Kakridis, 90, Greek classical scholar.
- Pierre Mange, 86, Swiss Olympic equestrian (1936).
- Armando Testa, 74, Italian graphic designer, cartoonist, animator and painter.

=== 21 ===
- Safiyar Behbudov, 24, Azerbaijani officer and war hero, killed in action.
- John Ireland, 78, Canadian actor (All the King's Men, Spartacus, Gunfight at the O.K. Corral), leukemia.
- René König, 85, German sociologist.
- John C. Sheehan, 76, American organic chemist.
- Natalie Sleeth, 61, American composer, cancer.

=== 22 ===
- William Aucamp, 60, South African Olympic water polo player (1952, 1960).
- Allen Bryant, 73, American baseball player.
- Joe Cantada, 50, Filipino sportscaster, lung cancer.
- Gruffydd Evans, Baron Evans of Claughton, 64, British solicitor and politician.
- Arthur Cronquist, 73, American biologist and botanist.
- Androkli Kostallari, 69, Albanian linguist and scholar.
- Melissa Stribling, 65, Scottish actress (Dracula, The League of Gentlemen, Compact).

=== 23 ===
- Jane Bernigau, 83, German SS Oberaufseherin before and during World War II
- Gurdial Singh Dhillon, 76, Indian politician from the Indian National Congress party.
- Friedrich Hayek, 92, Austrian economist, Nobel Prize recipient (1974).
- Ron Lapointe, 42, Canadian ice hockey coach, kidney cancer.

=== 24 ===
- Ryszard Białous, 77, Polish military figure.
- James K. Dressel, 48, American politician, AIDS.
- Albert Murray, 85, American painter.
- François Vallier, 91, French Olympic cross-country skier (1928).
- Naig Yusifov, 22, Azerbaijani soldier, killed in battle.

=== 25 ===
- David Archer, 63, British Olympic field hockey player (1956).
- Carl Austing, 81, American basketball player.
- Howard Christie, 79, American film producer.
- William Hoyt, 54, American politician, heart attack.
- Jahangir Jahangirov, 70, Soviet and Azerbaijani composer, conductor and choirmaster.
- Tahia Kazem, 72, First Lady of Egypt as wife of president Gamal Abdel Nasser.
- William Sears, 80, American writer and television and radio personality.
- Florence van Straten, 78, American atmospheric scientist, cancer.
- Nancy Walker, 69, American actress (Rhoda, McMillan & Wife, True Colors), lung cancer.
- Phillip Wilson, 50, American blues and jazz drummer, murdered.

=== 26 ===
- Bruno Cassinari, 79, Italian painter and sculptor.
- Elwood Driver, 70, American aviator.
- Barbara Frum, 54, Canadian journalist, leukemia.
- Nan Gindele, 81, American athlete and Olympian (1932).
- Pete Jones, 72, American baseball player.
- Arthur Lees, 84, English golfer.
- Rihei Sano, 79, Japanese football player and Olympian (1936).

=== 27 ===
- Gordon Adam, 76, American rower and Olympic champion (1936).
- Easley Blackwood, 88, American bridge player.
- Anita Colby, 77, American actress.
- Gerry Duggan, 81, Irish-Australian actor.
- Lang Hancock, 82, Australian iron ore magnate.
- Tom Kahn, 53, American trade union leader and civil right activist, AIDS.
- Leueen MacGrath, 77, English actress, complications from a stroke.
- Prem Nawas, 60, Indian actor and producer, train accident.
- Constant Pieterse, 96, Dutch Olympic rower (1924, 1928).
- Harald Sæverud, 94, Norwegian composer.
- Bobby Smith, 69, Irish footballer and Olympian (1948).
- James E. Webb, 85, American federal official, Administrator of NASA (1961–1968), heart attack.

=== 28 ===
- Ernie Caddel, 81, American gridiron football player (Portsmouth Spartans/Detroit Lions).
- Janne Furch, 76, German screenwriter.
- Elisabeth Granneman, 61, Norwegian singer, songwriter, children's writer and actress.
- Hari Ram Gupta, 90, Indian historian.
- Walter Marti, 81, Swiss Olympic boxer (1936).
- Wendell Mayes, 72, American screenwriter (Anatomy of a Murder, Von Ryan's Express, Death Wish), cancer.
- Blackie Pitt, 67, American NASCAR racing driver, cancer.
- Nikolaos Platon, 83, Greek archaeologist.
- Maurice Teynac, 76, French actor.
- Willard Tibbetts, 89, American Olympic runner (1924).

=== 29 ===
- Christopher Hawkes, 86, English archaeologist.
- William L. Hendricks, 87, United States Marine Corps officer and film producer.
- Paul Henreid, 84, Austrian-American actor (Casablanca, Now, Voyager, Joan of Paris), complications from a stroke.
- Fərhad Qəmbər oğlu Hümbətov, 23, Azerbaijani soldier and war hero, killed in action.
- Archie Marshek, 90, American film editor.
- John Spencer, 8th Earl Spencer, 68, English peer, courtier, and father of Diana, Princess of Wales, heart attack.
- Cecil F. White, 91, American farmer and politician, member of the United States House of Representatives (1949-1951).
- Eberhard Wächter, 62, Austrian baritone, heart attack.
- Bashir Hussain Zaidi, 93, Indian politician.

=== 30 ===
- Spirydion Albański, 84, Polish footballer and Olympian (1936).
- Manolis Andronikos, 72, Greek archaeologist.
- Luigi De Laurentiis, 75, Italian film producer.
- Amédée Fournier, 80, French road bicycle racer.
- Bert Grund, 72, German composer.
- Gerhard Gustmann, 81, German Olympic rower (1936).
- Harold LeVander, 81, American attorney and politician.
- Helmut Opschruf, 82, German Olympic weightlifter (1936).
- Winnie Shaw, 45, Scottish tennis player, brain cancer.

=== 31 ===
- Pam Buchanan, 55, Australian politician.
- Alfredo de Angelis, 79, Argentinian musician.
- Fritz Ganz, 76, Swiss Olympic cyclist (1936), and politician.
- N. R. Pillai, 93, Indian civil servant.
- Doug Roby, 94, American football player and Olympic Games official.
- Zenon Różycki, 78, Polish Olympic basketball player (1936).
- Ken Silvestri, 75, American baseball player (Chicago White Sox, New York Yankees, Philadelphia Phillies), coach and manager.
