= Qazançı =

Qazançı or Gazanchy may refer to:

- Qazançı, Agdam, Azerbaijan
- Qazançı, Goranboy, Azerbaijan
- Qazançı, Nakhchivan, Azerbaijan
- Qazançı, Zangilan, Azerbaijan

== See also ==
- Kazanchi (disambiguation)
