= Sündü =

Sündü or Sundy or Syundi or Syundyu may refer to:

- Sündü, Absheron, Azerbaijan
- Sündü, Gobustan, Azerbaijan
- Sundy, São Tomé and Príncipe
- Sundy Wongderree (born 1998), Thai footballer
