= List of National Heroes of Azerbaijan =

Recipients of the title National Hero of Azerbaijan

The following people are recipients of the title National Hero of Azerbaijan.

== 1992 ==
Name	Occupation
Alif Hajiyev	Khojaly airport police department, chief
Ilham Muzaffar Aliyev	Division Operating Commissioner, Ganja Internal Affairs Criminal Investigation Department, lieutenant
Mehdi Abbasov	Special Purpose Police Tribunal, lieutenant
Maharram Seyidov	Sharur District, Nakhchivan Autonomous Republic, Internal Affairs Chief Inspector of the Guard Department, captain
Mikayil Jabrailov	Field inspector of Internal Affairs in Shaki
Nofal Guliyev	Special Purpose Police Tribunal, militia
Seferali Gurban Mammadov	Aghdam District Internal Affairs Department Commander, militia lieutenant
Valeh Muslumov	Special Purpose Police Tribunal, militia sergeant
Vugar Huseynov	Special Purpose Police Tribunal, militia chief sergeant
Yuri Kovalev	Special Purpose Police Tribunal, militia
Yusif Aliyev	Baku City Police Department Command Academy
Albert Aqarunov	Tank commander
Agil Guliyev	Lieutenant
Canpolad Yagub Rzayev	Lieutenant, tank commander
Jalil Safarov	Captain
Elgiz Karimov	Soldier
Farhad Humbatov	Soldier
Fakhraddin Musayev	Chief lieutenant
Fikret Ali Hajiyev	Soldier
Firudin Shamoyev	Soldier
Mehman Sayadov	Soldier
Marifat Nasibov	Soldier
Naig Yusifov	Soldier
Parviz Samedov	Soldier
Ramiz Ganbarov	Soldier
Riad Ahmadov	Chief colonel
Rizvan Teymurov	Ministry of Interior Affairs, employee
Safiyar Behbudov	Lieutenant
Sarkhan Ojaqverdiyev	Soldier
Shahlar Isa Huseynov	Soldier
Tofig Mirsiyab Huseynov	Chief lieutenant
Yevgeni Nikolay Karlov	Captain
Yunis Aliyev	Soldier
Etibar Firuddin oğlu Hacıyev	Soldier
Kazımaqa Movsum Kerimov	Azerbaijan Republic Armed Forces, chief lieutenant
Mashallah Abdullayev	Azerbaijan Republic Armed Forces, chief lieutenant
Mohammed Alasgar Hasanov	Azerbaijan Republic Armed Forces, chief lieutenant
Sahin Talib Tagiyev	Azerbaijan Republic Armed Forces, captain
Shikar Shikarov	Azerbaijan Republic Armed Forces, chief olonel
Anatoly Nikolayevich Davidovich	Azerbaijan Republic Armed Forces, major
Sayavush Hasan Hasanov	Azerbaijan Republic Armed Forces, soldier
Seymour Gahraman Mammadov	Azerbaijan Republic Armed Forces, soldier
Aabbas Gara Iskenderov	Azerbaijan Republic Armed Forces, soldier
Hikmet Baba	Interior Ministry Fire Protection, employee
Javanshir Izzet Rahimov	Air Force, soldier
Ruslan Aleksandr Polovinko	Air Force, lieutenant
Sergey Alexander Senyushkin	Air Force, major
Yaver Yagub Aliyev	Air Force, captain
Zakir Nusrat Majidov	Air Force, chief lieutenant
Ali Hussein Mammadov	Main Directorate of Internal Affairs of Baku, police sergeant
Ilgar Sadi Ismailov	Binəqədi raion Police Office Investigation of Crimes Operation, police captain
Tahir Tofig Hasanov	Ministry of Internal Affairs officer, police sergeant, special police officer
Enver Talış Arazov	Officer of the Ministry of Internal Affairs, group commander, captain
Fakhraddin Vilayeddin Najafov	Officer of the Ministry of Internal Affairs, group commander, chief lieutenant
Igor Vladimir Makeyev	Ministry of Internal Affairs, employee
Matlam Kamran Guliyev	Ministry of Internal Affairs, subdivision commander, lieutenant
Ruslan Hamid Muradov	Ministry of Internal Affairs, ordinary employee
Sakhavat Alamdar Maharramov	Ministry of Internal Affairs, ordinary employee
Salatyn Asgarova	Youth of Azerbaijan, newspaper correspondent
Ali Mustafayev	AR State Teleradio Company's Screen of the Day, chief editor
Chingiz Fuad Mustafayev	AR State Teleradio Company's 215-KL, studio TV journalist
Aliyar Aliyev	
Arastun Isfendi Mahmudov	
Asad Soltan Asadov	
Hikmet Ogtay Muradov	
Safa Fatulla Akhundov	
Viktor Vasilyevich Seryogin	
Fakhraddin Shahbazov	
Asif Maharammov	
Aslan Atakishiyev	
Beyler Tapdıg Aghayev	
Bakhsheyis Pashayev	
Alekper Hasan Aliyev	
Ikhtiyar Kasimov	
Rovshan Nariman Aliyev	
Yunis Najafov	
Mirasgar Mir Abdulla Seyidov	

== 1993 ==
Name	Occupation
Aqil Samed Mammadov	Soldier
Assad Jalal Ahmedov	Ministry of Defense, foreman
Kamil Nasibov	Senior lieutenant
Mazahir Izzet Rustamov	Lieutenant
Mukhtar Jahid Gasimov	Ministry of Defense, medical service captain
Niyazi Sharafkhan oglu Aslanov	Soldier
Qasım Kara Rzayev	Soldier
Şövqiyar Cəmil Abdullayev	Sergeant-major
Tahir Əminağa Bağırov	Chief sergeant
Zakir Yusifov	Major
Allahverdi Baghirov	Soldier
Vazir Orujov	Deputy group commander
Yusuf Vali Mirzoyev	Deputy brigade commander
Kerem Arshad Mirzoyev	Qubadli District Police Department, field official, chief lieutenant
Ogtay Gulay Gulaliyev	Lachin District Police Department Post-Patrol Service Battalion, commander, lieutenant
Vasili Ahmed Aliyev	Qubadli District Police Department, foreman
Etibar Biskagha Aliyev	Lankaran Household, service manager
Pasha Gurban Tahmazov	Lankaran Service Department, employee
Sultanga Nahmat Bayramov	Military Hospital of Ministry of Defense in Lankaran, X-ray technician
Gültəkin Əsgərova	Clinical Urology Hospital, physician, anesthesiologist, resuscitator

== 1994 ==
Name	Occupation
Etibar Beyler Ismailov	
İbrahim İsmayıl Məmmədov	
Rövşən Telman Əkbərov	
Yelmar Şahmar Edilov	
Shirin Vali Mirzayev	

== 1995 ==
Name	Occupation
Yalcin Canhasan Nasirov	Ministry of Defence
Arif Maasif Gedimaliev	
Elshan Huseynov	

== 1996 ==
Name	Occupation
Chingiz Babayev	

== 2009 ==
Name	Occupation
Elton Khaleddin Iskenderov	AR Border Guard Service

== 2010 ==
Name	Occupation
Mubariz Ibrahimov	Armed Forces, warrant officer

== 2016 ==
Name	Occupation
Murad Telman Mirzoyev	Lieutenant colonel
Samid Gülağa Imanov	Major
Shukur Nariman Hamidov	Lieutenant colonel

== 2017 ==
Name
Chingiz Salman oglu Gurbanov

== 2024 ==
Name	Occupation
Natig Gasimov	Soldier
Igor Kshnyakin	Azerbaijan Airlines, pilot
Aleksandr Kalyaninov	Azerbaijan Airlines, pilot
Hokuma Aliyeva	Azerbaijan Airlines, flight attendant
