= Mehman Sayadov =

- Born: November 21, 1972; Gunashli, Vardenis District, Armenian SSR, USSR
- Died: May 9, 1992 (aged 19); Nabilar, Shusha District, Azerbaijan
- Military career
- Allegiance: Republic of Azerbaijan
- Service years: 1991-1992
- Conflicts: First Nagorno-Karabakh War
- Awards: National Hero of Azerbaijan; 1992

Mehman Sayadov (Azerbaijani: Sayadov Qəzənfər oğlu Mehman) (November 21, 1972, Gyunashli, Basargechar – May 9, 1992, Nabilar, Shusha District, Azerbaijan) was the National Hero of Azerbaijan, and the warrior of the Karabakh war.

== Biography ==
Mehman Sayadov was born on 21 November 1972 in Guneshli village of Vardenis District. He was graduating from the seventh class of secondary school in this village when Armenians deported Azerbaijanis in 1988. After being deported that year, he moved with his family to the Samukh District.

In 1988 he was one of the most active participants of the Azerbaijan National Liberation Movement. When he was 18, he was drafted to the Soviet Army. At this time, the incidents in Nagorno Karabakh were deeply disturbed him. After serving six months in the Soviet Army, he returned home and went to the front line as a volunteer.

== Military career ==
Mehman Sayadov joined a self-defense battalion named "The Karabakh of Azerbaijan" and went to the front line as a volunteer on November 5, 1991. He showed courage and firmness in the battles around the villages of Kosalar and Nabilar of the Shusha District. Mehman Sayadov was killed in the battle around the village of Nabilar on May 9, 1992.

== Memorial ==
He was posthumously awarded the title of "National Hero of Azerbaijan" by Presidential Decree No. 833 dated 7 June 1992. Despite all the attempts, his body could not be taken from the battlefield.

== See also ==
- First Nagorno-Karabakh War
- List of National Heroes of Azerbaijan

== Sources ==
- Vugar Asgarov. Azərbaycanın Milli Qəhrəmanları (Yenidən işlənmiş II nəşr). Bakı: "Dərələyəz-M", 2010, səh. 254.
