= Humbatov =

Humbatov is a surname. Notable people with the surname include:

- Farhad Humbatov (1968–1992) National Hero of Azerbaijan
- Tural Humbatov (born 1994), Azerbaijani footballer
