= Kazanchi =

Ghazanchi or Kazanchi may refer to:

- Ghazanchi, Armenia
- Meghrashen, Armenia
- Qazançı (disambiguation), places in Azerbaijan
