= Van Straten =

Van Straten is a Dutch toponymic surname meaning "from/of Straten". Also van Straaten or van Starting, translated as "street", there are a number of settlements in the Low Countries with that name, including Groningen and Leeuwaden in Northern Netherlands, Straten near Oirschot in North Brabant.

Land-granted nobility noted in the Dutch Hoge Raad van Adel as Baron/Baronness and Knight/Jonkvrouwen title-holders from Groningen, Friesland and Drenthe dating to the pre-1814 Dutch Provincial Period.

Notable people with the surname include:

- Hendrik van Strating / Straten (1875–1925), One of the first Dutch settlers of Whidbey Island (Washington State, USA); timbering forests for carpentry, settling farm land (Dutch Valley) near present-day Ault Field (US Naval Air Station Whidbey Island) and establishing a provisions/merchant store in Oak Harbor, WA; original barn (c.1901) can be seen at Naval Air Station perimeter with other original Dutch homestead barns and houses that were documented, disassembled and reassembled by the US Government. Later was also an initial settler of Brooks, Alberta (between Calgary and Medicine Hat, Canada) before joining family in Pease, MN.
- Florence van Straten (1913–1992), American aerological engineer
- Frank van Straten (born 1936), Australian historian
- Giorgio van Straten (born 1955), Italian writer
- Henri Van Straten (1892–1944), Belgian lithographer
- Kristin Bauer van Straten (born 1966), American actress
- Nico Leonard Willem van Straten (1897–1968), Dutch major general who defended Timor in World War II
- Rocco van Straten (born 1991), Dutch snowboarder

== See also ==
- 12708 Van Straten, main-belt asteroid named after Henri Van Straten
- Van Straaten, variant spelling of the surname
