= Nebiler =

Nebiler can refer to:

- Nəbilər (disambiguation)
  - Nəbilər, Kalbajar, Azerbaijan
  - Nəbilər, Shusha, Azerbaijan
- Nebiler, Bayramiç, Turkey
- Nebiler, Dikili, Turkey
- Nebiler, Korkuteli, Turkey
- Nebiler, Serik, Turkey
