= Nəbilər =

Nəbilər or Nabilar or Nebiler may refer to:

- Nəbilər, Kalbajar, a village in the Kalbajar District of Azerbaijan
- Nəbilər, Shusha, a village in the Shusha District of Azerbaijan

== See also ==
- Nebiler (disambiguation)
