= Parviz Samedov =

- Born: May 5, 1970; Ganja, Azerbaijan
- Died: May 15, 1992 (aged 22); Gülablı, Aghdam, Azerbaijan
- Military career
- Allegiance: Republic of Azerbaijan
- Service years: 1992
- Conflicts: First Nagorno-Karabakh War
- Awards: National Hero of Azerbaijan; 1992

Parviz Samedov (Azerbaijani: Pərviz Əbdüləhəd oğlu Səmədov) (May 5, 1970, Ganja, Azerbaijan – May 15, 1992, Gülablı, Aghdam, Azerbaijan) was the National Hero of Azerbaijan, and the warrior of the First Nagorno-Karabakh War.

== Biography ==
Parviz Samedov was born on 5 May 1970 in Ganja, Azerbaijan. He studied at the secondary school in Ganja from 1977 to 1985. He was drafted to Soviet Army in 1988. After completing his military service in Chita, he returned to Azerbaijan. He got a job in the Textile Factory. When Armenians attacked the territory of Azerbaijan, Parviz Samedov joined the ranks of Azerbaijani Armed Forces as a volunteer in 1992 and appointed as a Commander-in-Chief.

== In battles ==
Parviz Samedov participated in battles for the villages of Shelli, Pirjamal, Nakhchivanli, and Aranzamin. Parviz was the head of the Intelligence Unit. He destroyed dozens of armored vehicles and ammunition of Armenian soldiers. There were terrible fights in the Gyulably village of Agdam District on May 15, 1992. At this time, Parviz and his Intelligence Unit went to the area to participate in the battles. It was possible to save the crew of the "Ambulance" helicopter hit by the Armenians, but Parviz had lost his life in this battle.

== Family ==
He was married and had one son.

== Awards ==
Parviz Samedov was posthumously awarded the title of "National Hero of Azerbaijan" by Presidential Decree No. 833 dated 7 June 1992.

== Memorial ==
He was buried in Ganja. There is a street in Ganja named after him.

== See also ==
- First Nagorno-Karabakh War
- List of National Heroes of Azerbaijan

== Sources ==
- Vugar Asgarov. Azərbaycanın Milli Qəhrəmanları (Yenidən işlənmiş II nəşr). Bakı: "Dərələyəz-M", 2010, səh. 263.
