= Atakishiyev =

Atakishiyev (Azerbaijani: Atakişiyev, Russian: Атакишиев) is an Azerbaijani surname. It may refer to:

- Agasalim Atakishiyev (1900–1970), Azerbaijani politician
- Alisattar Atakishiyev (1906–1990), Azerbaijani film director and cinematographer
- Aslan Atakishiyev (1953–1992), Azerbaijani soldier
- Rauf Atakishiyev (1925–1994), Azerbaijani singer, pianist and music teacher
