= Ruslan Muradov =

National Hero of Azerbaijan

- Ruslan Muradov
- Born: 27 June 1973; Mingachevir, Azerbaijan SSR
- Died: 22 August 1992 (aged 19); Papravənd, Agdam, Azerbaijan
- Military career
- Allegiance: Azerbaijan
- Branch: Azerbaijani Armed Forces
- Service years: 1991–1992
- Conflicts: First Nagorno-Karabakh War
- Awards: National Hero of Azerbaijan; 1992

Ruslan Hamid oglu Muradov (Azerbaijani: Muradov Ruslan Həmid oğlu; 27 June 1973, Mingachevir, Azerbaijan SSR – 22 August 1992, Papravənd, Agdam, Azerbaijan) was the National Hero of Azerbaijan and a warrior during the First Nagorno-Karabakh War.

== Early life and education ==
Muradov was born on 27 June 1973 in Mingachevir, Azerbaijan SSR. In 1990, he completed his secondary education in Mingachevir. He later worked at Mingachevir Technical Rubber Plant, where his father worked. He joined Azerbaijani Armed Forces in 1992 and was appointed to the Papravand village of Agdam District.

Muradov was single.

== First Nagorno-Karabakh War ==
When Armenians attacked the territory of Azerbaijan, Muradov voluntarily joined the Azerbaijani Armed Forces and was sent to participate in the battles around the village of Papravand of Agdam District. The village was released from Armenian soldiers.

In 1992, one of the aircraft belonging to Azerbaijan fled to the territory controlled by Armenian soldiers and was shot down. A group of Azerbaijani soldiers was sent to rescue the wounded.

Muradov was killed during the battles for Papravand on 22 August 1992.

== Honors ==
Ruslan Hamid oglu Muradov was posthumously awarded the title of the "National Hero of Azerbaijan" by Presidential Decree No. 290 dated 6 November 1992.

He was buried at a Martyrs' Lane cemetery in Mingachevir. The Secondary School No. 15 in Mingachevir was named after him.

== See also ==
- First Nagorno-Karabakh War
- List of National Heroes of Azerbaijan
