= Alabbas Iskandarov =

National Hero of Azerbaijan

Alabbas Isgandarov
- Born: November 20, 1958; Kurdlar, Agdam District, Azerbaijan SSR, USSR
- Died: March 4, 1992 (aged 33); Gazanchy, Agdam District, Azerbaijan
- Military career
- Allegiance: Republic of Azerbaijan
- Conflicts: First Nagorno-Karabakh War
- Awards: National Hero of Azerbaijan; 1992

Alabbas Gara oghlu Isgandarov (Azerbaijani: Əlabbas İsgəndərov) (20 November 1958, Kurdlar, Agdam District, Azerbaijan SSR, USSR - 4 March 1992, Gazanchy, Agdam District, Azerbaijan) was the National Hero of Azerbaijan and warrior during the Nagorno-Karabakh conflict.

== Early life and education ==
Isgandarov was born on 20 November 1958 in Kurdlar village of Agdam District of Azerbaijan SSR. He completed his secondary education at Kurdlar village secondary school. Isgandarov served in the Soviet Armed Forces. In 1991, he voluntarily joined self-defense battalion in Agdam.

=== Personal life ===
Isgandarov was married and had three children.

== First Nagorno-Karabakh War ==
When First Nagorno-Karabakh War started, Iskandarov voluntarily joined one of the self-defense battalions formed in Agdam. He participated in battles around the village of Umudlu. Iskandarov and his soldiers surrounded by Armenian forces in Umudlu and were unable to escape. The Armenian militants fired on them from all sides. After a long period of besiege, Isgandarov was able to secretly return to his military unit with his soldiers.

On March 4, 1992, he was killed in a heavy battle around the village of Gazanchy.

== Honors ==
Alabbas Gara oghlu Isgandarov was posthumously awarded the title of the "National Hero of Azerbaijan" by Presidential Decree No. 135 dated 13 August 1992.

He was buried at a Martyrs' Lane cemetery in Agdam.

== See also ==
- First Nagorno-Karabakh War
- List of National Heroes of Azerbaijan

== Sources ==
- Vugar Asgarov. Azərbaycanın Milli Qəhrəmanları (Yenidən işlənmiş II nəşr). Bakı: "Dərələyəz-M", 2010, səh. 140–141.
