= Shikar Shikarov =

Azerbbaijani soldier

- Born: December 3, 1953; Baku, Azerbaijan SSR
- Died: June 13, 1992 (aged 38); Aghdara
- Military career
- Allegiance: Republic of Azerbaijan
- Conflicts: First Nagorno-Karabakh War
- Awards: National Hero of Azerbaijan; 1992

Shikar Shukur oglu Shikarov (Azerbaijani: Şikar Şikarov) (3 December 1953, Baku, Azerbaijan SSR – 13 June 1992, Aghdara) was the military serviceman of Azerbaijan Armed Forces, Chief Colonel and warrior during the Nagorno-Karabakh conflict.

== Early life and education ==
Shikarov was born on 3 December 1953 in Baku, Azerbaijan SSR. In 1971, he completed his secondary education at the Secondary School No. 46 in Baku. In the same year, he entered the Baku High School of Commanders of the Ministry of Defense of the USSR. After completing his education in 1975, he started to work as a commander in one of the military units in Primorsky Krai.

In 1986, Shikarov was admitted to the M.V. Frunze Military Academy of the USSR Ministry of Defense. Following his graduation in 1989, he was appointed the Chief of the General Staff in one of the military units located in Luhansk, Ukraine.

=== Personal life ===
Shikarov was married and had two children.

== First Nagorno-Karabakh War ==
After the events of the Black January, Shikarov returned to Azerbaijan. Soon afterward, he started to work as the Chief of Operations Department at the Civil Defense Headquarters, and later in 1992 was appointed the First Deputy Chief of General Staff of the Armed Forces of the Republic of Azerbaijan.

In 1992, Shikarov led military operations in Goranboy District. On June 13, 1992, he was killed in one of the battles around Aghdara District.

== Honors ==
Shikar Shukur oglu Shikarov was posthumously awarded the title of the "National Hero of Azerbaijan" by Presidential Decree No. 6 dated 23 June 1992.

He was buried at a Martyrs' Lane cemetery in Baku. A school in Syundi village of the Gobustan Rayon of Azerbaijan was named after him.

== See also ==
- First Nagorno-Karabakh War
- List of National Heroes of Azerbaijan

== Sources ==
- Vugar Asgarov. Azərbaycanın Milli Qəhrəmanları (Yenidən işlənmiş II nəşr). Bakı: "Dərələyəz-M", 2010, səh. 269.
