= Igor Vladimirovich Makeyev =

National Hero of Azerbaijan

- İqor Makeyev
- Born: October 27, 1971; Ganja, Azerbaijan SSR
- Died: August 2, 1992 (aged 20); Aghdara District
- Military career
- Allegiance: Azerbaijan
- Branch: Azerbaijani Armed Forces
- Service years: 1991-1992
- Conflicts: First Nagorno-Karabakh War
- Awards: National Hero of Azerbaijan; 1992

Igor Vladimirovich Makeyev (Azerbaijani: İqor Vladimiroviç Makeyev, Russian: Игорь Владимирович Макеев) (27 October 1971 in Ganja, Azerbaijan SSR - 2 August 1992 in the Aghdara District, Azerbaijan) was a National Hero of Azerbaijan and warrior during the First Nagorno-Karabakh War.

== Early life and education ==
Makeyev was born on October 27, 1971, in Ganja, Azerbaijan SSR. He went to Secondary School No. 39 in Baku between 1979 and 1987. In 1990, Makeyev was drafted to the Soviet Armed Forces and served in Baku and in Rostov, Russia.

When the First Nagorno-Karabakh war started, Makeyev returned to Ganja. He joined one of the military units in the Ministry of Internal Affairs of Azerbaijan and voluntarily went to the front-line.

=== Personal life ===
Makeyev was single.

== First Nagorno-Karabakh War ==
On June 5, 1992, Armenians attacked the Nakhchivanli village. Makeyev participated in battles around the village and killed dozens of Armenian soldiers. He also participated in several battles around Aghdara during the First Nagorno-Karabakh War. On August 2, 1992, he was killed in a fight with Armenian soldiers around Vishka.

== Honors ==
Makeyev was posthumously awarded the title of "National Hero of Azerbaijan" by Presidential Decree No. 290 dated 6 November 1992. He was buried at a Martyrs' Lane cemetery in Ganja. A street in Sadilli village was named after him.

== See also ==
- First Nagorno-Karabakh War
- List of National Heroes of Azerbaijan

== Sources ==
- Vugar Asgarov. Azərbaycanın Milli Qəhrəmanları (Yenidən işlənmiş II nəşr). Bakı: "Dərələyəz-M", 2010, səh. 180.
