= Ramiz Ganbarov =

- Born: July 2, 1962; Shusha, Azerbaijan
- Died: April 30, 1992 (aged 29); Shusha, Azerbaijan
- Military career
- Allegiance: Republic of Azerbaijan
- Service years: 1992
- Conflicts: First Nagorno-Karabakh War
- Awards: National Hero of Azerbaijan; 1992

Ramiz Ganbarov (Azerbaijani: Ramiz Bulud oğlu Qənbərov) (July 2, 1962, Shusha, Azerbaijan – April 30, 1992, Shusha, Azerbaijan) was a National Hero of Azerbaijan, the Commander of Shusha self-defense battalion and a veteran of the First Nagorno-Karabakh War.

== Biography ==
Ramiz Ganbarov was born on 2 July 1962 in Shusha, Azerbaijan. In 1979, he graduated from Shusha secondary school #1 named after H. Hajiyev. He was called up to military service in 1980. After completing his military service in 1982, he returned to Shusha. In 1986, he entered the Azerbaijan Civil Engineering Institute, but he could not complete his education.

== First Nagorno-Karabakh War ==
When the Armenian invaders attacked the territory of Azerbaijan, the Azerbaijanis voluntarily sent to the front-line to defend their lands. Ramiz Ganbarov established a volunteer self-defense battalion and became the head of it. He participated in the battles around Kərkicahan, Kosalar, Nəbilər, Qaybalı, Malıbəyli, Quşçular, Göytala villages of Shusha District. On April 29, 1992, when the Armenian invaders attacked the positions near the villages of Kosalar və Kərkicahan, Ramiz Gambarov's battalion joined the battles. One day later, on April 30, 1992, he died in this fight.

== Awards ==
Ramiz Ganbarov was posthumously awarded the title of "National Hero of Azerbaijan" by Presidential Decree No. 833 dated 7 June 1992.

== Memorial ==
He was buried in Shusha District. One of the streets in Baku is named after him.

== See also ==
- First Nagorno-Karabakh War
- List of National Heroes of Azerbaijan

== Sources ==
- Vugar Asgarov. Azərbaycanın Milli Qəhrəmanları (Yenidən işlənmiş II nəşr). Bakı: "Dərələyəz-M", 2010, səh. 159–160.
