= Kürdlər, Agdam =

Kurdlar
- Azerbaijani: Kürdlər
- Location within Azerbaijan Location within Karabakh Economic Region
- Coordinates: 39°58′N 46°53′E
- Country: Azerbaijan
- District: Agdam
- Time zone: UTC+4 (AZT)
  - Summer (DST): UTC+5 (AZT)

Kürdlər (also, Kurdlar and Kurtlar) is a village in the Agdam District of Azerbaijan.

== Notable natives ==
- Aliabbas Isgandarov — National Hero of Azerbaijan.
