= Papravand Mausoleum =

14th century site in Agdam District, Azerbaijan

Coordinates: 40.157047°N 46.841712°E

- Papravənd türbəsi
- Interactive map of Papravand Mausoleum
- Location: Papravənd village, Agdam District, Azerbaijan
- Completion date: 14th century

Papravand mausoleum (Azerbaijani: Papravənd türbəsi) – is a mausoleum in Papravənd village in Agdam District of Azerbaijan. It was constructed in the 14th century. The mausoleum is considered as a unique monument of the architecture of the medieval ages. The mausoleum was cleaned, measured and learnt in July 1972.

Since the summer of 1993, the part of Aghdam District where the mausoleum is located, has been controlled by the unrecognized Republic of Artsakh and according to the United Nations Security Council Resolution 853 it is occupied by the Armenian armed forces.

== Architecture ==
The mausoleum is quadrangular in its external shape, but the inner hall is cross-shaped. The external dimensions of the mausoleum are – 5.8 by 6.0 metres (19.0 ft × 19.7 ft), but the internal dimensions are 5 by 5 metres (16 ft × 16 ft). The mausoleum walls are 1.4 metres (4 ft 7 in) tall, and .4 metres (1 ft 4 in) thick and covered with limestone.

The plan of the mausoleum is typical for the 16th century and is related to the construction of the cupola. Its central part is covered with a cupola, but its branches are covered with ogives. The transition of the central square to the cupola is made with the help of pendentives.

Entrance to the mausoleum is from the open veranda of the main facade. There are small niches with dimensions of .9 by .95 metres (2 ft 11 in × 3 ft 1 in) and 1 by 1.35 metres (3 ft 3 in × 4 ft 5 in) in the other three facades from the inner part.

At present, the mausoleum is partly destroyed. There aren’t any ligatures on the mausoleum. Considering the architectural structure of the building - arched construction with a cupola, and also the decorative work on the facades’ walls, the monument dates from the 16th century.

== Literature ==
- Мамед-заде К. М. Паправендский мавзолей. — ДАН Азерб. ССР, 1974. — № 12. — С. 86— 89.
