= Matlab Guliyev =

National Hero of Azerbaijan (1959–1992)

- Mətləb Quliyev
- Born: January 9, 1959; Beylagan District, Azerbaijan SSR
- Died: August 31, 1992 (aged 33); Aghdam, Azerbaijan
- Military career
- Allegiance: Azerbaijan
- Branch: Azerbaijani Armed Forces
- Service years: 1991-1992
- Conflicts: First Nagorno-Karabakh War
- Awards: National Hero of Azerbaijan; 1992

Matlab Kamran oglu Guliyev (Azerbaijani: Quliyev Mətləb Kamran oğlu) (9 January 1959, Beylagan District, Azerbaijan SSR - 31 August 1992, Aghdam, Azerbaijan) was the National Hero of Azerbaijan and warrior during the First Nagorno-Karabakh War.

== Early life and education ==
Guliyev was born on January 9, 1959, in Beylagan District, Azerbaijan SSR. He completed his secondary education at the Secondary School No. 3 in Beylagan District. He was then admitted to the Jamshid Nakhchivanski Military Lyceum. He Guliyev was drafted to the Soviet Armed Forces and served in Ukraine. After completing his military service, he entered the Azerbaijan State Pedagogical University. Following his graduation in 1985, he started to work as a military trainer in the Secondary School No. 3 in Sumgayit. In 1992, he subsequently worked in the Ministry of Internal Affairs of Azerbaijan.

== First Nagorno-Karabakh War ==
When Armenians attacked the territories of Azerbaijan, Guliyev was ordered to the Agdam District. On August 31, 1992, he was killed in fight with Armenian armed troops in Agdam.

=== Personal life ===
Guliyev was married and had two children.

== Honors ==
Guliyev was posthumously awarded the title of the "National Hero of Azerbaijan" by Presidential Decree No. 290 dated 6 November 1992.

He was buried at a Martyrs' Lane cemetery in Baku. The Secondary School No. 3 in Sumgayit was named after him.

== See also ==
- First Nagorno-Karabakh War
- List of National Heroes of Azerbaijan

== Sources ==
- Vugar Asgarov. Azərbaycanın Milli Qəhrəmanları (Yenidən işlənmiş II nəşr). Bakı: "Dərələyəz-M", 2010, səh. 168–169.
