= Nofal Guliyev =

National Hero of Azerbaijan

- Born: October 4, 1963; Shirvan, Azerbaijan
- Died: October 13, 1991 (aged 28); Todan
- Military career
- Allegiance: Republic of Azerbaijan
- Conflicts: First Nagorno-Karabakh War
- Awards: National Hero of Azerbaijan; 1992

Nofal Guliyev (Azerbaijani: Nofəl Zahid oğlu Quliyev) (October 4, 1963, Shirvan, Azerbaijan – October 13, 1991, Todan) was the National Hero of Azerbaijan, and the warrior of the First Nagorno-Karabakh War.

== Life ==
Nofel Guliyev was born on October 4, 1963, in Shirvan, Azerbaijan. He graduated from high school in 1981. He served in the Azerbaijani Armed Forces in 1982–1983. After the military service, he worked in Tumen from 1984 to 1990. In December 1990, he entered the Special Forces of Ministry of Internal Affairs of the Republic of Azerbaijan to participate in the protection of Azerbaijan's territorial integrity.

== Military activities ==
Nofal Guliyev participated in battles against Armenian armed forces in Fuzuli, Goranboy, Nagorno Karabagh. He chose the most difficult positions in every battle. He tried to be an example for his friends and fought against the enemy forces. On July 15, 1991, Armenians attacked the village of Todan with more powerful force and military technique. Nofel tried his best to evacuate civilians from the battlefield. He took the villagers to a safe place. Then he came back to take part in the battle around the village of Todan. Nofel was killed by the soldiers of the Armenian army in the battle of Todan.

== Memorial ==
By decree of the President of Azerbaijan on February 5, 1993, Nofal Guliyev was posthumously awarded the title of "National Hero of Azerbaijan".

== Sources ==
- Vüqar Əsgərov. "Azərbaycanın Milli Qəhrəmanları" (Yenidən işlənmiş II nəşr). Bakı: "Dərələyəz-M", 2010, səh. 173.
