= Viktor Vasilyevich Seryogin =

- Виктор Васильевич Серёгин
- Born: 23 March 1944; Tbilisi, Georgian SSR, Soviet Union
- Died: 28 January 1992 (aged 47); Shusha, Azerbaijan
- Military career
- Allegiance: Azerbaijan
- Branch: Azerbaijani Air and Air Defence Force
- Service years: 1991-1992
- Conflicts: First Nagorno-Karabakh War
- Awards: National Hero of Azerbaijan; 1992

Viktor Vasilyevich Seryogin (Russian: Виктор Васильевич Серёгин, Azerbaijani: Viktor Vasilyeviç Seryogin) (23 March 1944 in Tbilisi – 28 January 1992 in Shusha) was an Azeri military helicopter pilot who fought during the First Nagorno-Karabakh War, he was posthumously awarded the title National Hero of Azerbaijan.

== Early life and education ==
Seryogin was born on 23 March 1944 in Tbilisi, Georgian SSR, Soviet Union. After completing his education at the Keremenchug Aviation School in 1986, he was appointed the pilot of Mi-2 helicopter of Zabrat separate aviation team. He made a great contribution in establishing the Azerbaijani Air Force. Seryogin was awarded the Medal "Veteran of Labour" and named the Best Pilot.

=== Personal life ===
Seryogin was married and had two children. Due to the 2022 Russian invasion of Ukraine, the family of Seryogin, who lived in Kharkiv, were evacuated to Azerbaijan. According to his daughter Oksana, she was immediately evacuated to Chișinău, Moldova with he help of a member of the National Assembly of Azerbaijan, a member of the Azeri diaspora in Kyiv and the Azeri ambassador to Moldova.

== First Nagorno-Karabakh War ==
When the First Nagorno-Karabakh War started, Seryogin was appointed to the front-line. He participated in many flights to the war zone of Nagorno Karabakh and border regions of Azerbaijan. His helicopter was severely attacked and damaged by Armenian soldiers many times during his flights. The crew of the helicopter repaired it under the attacks of Armenian armed forces and continued to fulfill their assignments.

On 28 January 1992 the Azerbaijani transport helicopter Mil Mi-8 was reportedly shot down by Armenians near the town of Shusha. Seryogin flew the burning helicopter away from the residential area. As a result he was tragically killed together with the whole crew and passengers on the board.

== Honors ==
Viktor Vasilyevich Seryogin was posthumously awarded the title of the "National Hero of Azerbaijan" by Presidential Decree No. 337 dated 25 November 1992.

He was buried at a Martyrs' Lane cemetery in Baku.

== See also ==
- First Nagorno-Karabakh War
- List of National Heroes of Azerbaijan
- Azerbaijani Air and Air Defence Force
- 1992 Azerbaijani Mil Mi-8 shootdown
