= Sovqiyar Abdullayev =

National Hero of Azerbaijan

- Born: 5 April 1969; Vardenis, Armenia SSR
- Died: 27 August 1992 (aged 23); Aghdara, Azerbaijan
- Military career
- Allegiance: Republic of Azerbaijan
- Conflicts: First Nagorno-Karabakh War
- Awards: National Hero of Azerbaijan; 1993

Sovqiyar Jamil oglu Abdullayev (Azerbaijani: Şövqiyar Abdullayev) (5 April 1969, Vardenis, Armenia SSR – 27 August 1992, Aghdara, Azerbaijan) was the military serviceman of Azerbaijan Armed Forces, and soldier during the First Nagorno-Karabakh War.

== Early life and education ==
Abdullayev was born on 5 April 1969 in Vardenis, Armenia SSR. In 1986, he completed his secondary education at Narimanli village secondary school and entered the Azerbaijan Technical University. He was drafted to the Soviet Armed Forces in 1987 while he was studying in the university and completed his service in Mongolia in 1989 and returned to Baku.

=== Personal life ===
Abdullayev was single.

== First Nagorno-Karabakh War ==
When the First Nagorno-Karabakh war started, Abdullayev enlisted in Azerbaijan Armed Forces in 1992 and was appointed a commander of a tank brigade in Aghdam. His tank brigade chose the village of Abdal-Gulabli as a position for themselves and participated in battles around the villages of Papravend, Pirdgamal, Aranzami and others. On 23 August 1992 his tank brigade was mysteriously sent from the strategically significant height around Gulabli village to Aghdara in order to participate in the protection of the village of Drambon. Within a short time the resistance of the Armenian-Russian units in the village of Drambon was broken and the village was liberated. At the same time, a large number of besieged Azerbaijani soldiers were released. Abdullayev's tank was shot several times during the battles for Drambon village. He got wounded in both legs and was sent to the Aghdam military hospital. He refused to stay in the hospital and went back to the front-line. On 27 August 1992 he was killed in a heavy battle when he was trying to rescue his soldiers from being captured.

== Honors ==
Sovqiyar Jamil oglu Abdullayev was posthumously awarded the title of the "National Hero of Azerbaijan" by Presidential Decree No. 457 dated 5 February 1993.

He was buried at a Martyrs' Lane cemetery in Baku on 29 August 1992.

== See also ==
- First Nagorno-Karabakh War
- List of National Heroes of Azerbaijan

== Sources ==
- Vugar Asgarov. Azərbaycanın Milli Qəhrəmanları (Yenidən işlənmiş II nəşr). Bakı: "Dərələyəz-M", 2010, səh. 19–20.
