= Jeyhun Mirzayev =

Actor and film director

- Born: Jeyhun Mirzayev; April 9, 1946; Gulabli, Aghdam, Azerbaijani SSR, USSR
- Died: March 5, 1993 (aged 46); Baku, Azerbaijan
- Education: Azerbaijan State University of Culture and Arts
- Occupations: Actor, director
- Years active: 1960–1993
- Spouse: Lidiya Mirzayeva
- Children: 1

Jeyhun Jamil oglu Mirzayev (Azerbaijani: Ceyhun Mirzəyev; April 9, 1946, Gulabli, Aghdam – March 5, 1993, Baku) was an Azerbaijani actor and film director.

== Career ==
Mirzayev was born in the Gulabli village, in Aghdam, Azerbaijan, to Jamil Mirzayev and his second wife Margarita. He had a half-sister from his mother's previous marriage to Yusif Mammadaliyev's brother Ibrahim. Mirzayev's father died when he was just three years old. Noted for his good performance skills, he became a child actor in 1955 when he acted in the film The Meeting. Three years later, at age 12, Mirzayev played the leading role of young Ismayil in the film Stepmother. He later graduated from Azerbaijan State University of Culture and Arts majoring in film directing. He was most notable for starring and directing an Azerbaijani war film The Scream in 1993. Mirzayev was expected to be on movie's opening but he died from a sudden heart attack.
