= Sarkhan Ojaqverdiyev =

- Born: 16 July 1967; Goranboy, Azerbaijan
- Died: 5 May 1992 (aged 24); Talish, Azerbaijan
- Military career
- Allegiance: Republic of Azerbaijan
- Service years: 1992
- Conflicts: First Nagorno-Karabakh War
- Awards: National Hero of Azerbaijan; 1992

Sarkhan Ojaqverdiyev (Azerbaijani: Sərxan Surxay oğlu Ocaqverdiyev) (16 July 1967, Goranboy, Azerbaijan – 5 May 1992, Talish, Goranboy, Azerbaijan) was the National Hero of Azerbaijan, and the warrior of the First Nagorno-Karabakh War.

== Early life and education ==
Sarkhan Ojaqverdiyev was born on 16 July 1967 in Safikyurd village in the Goranboy Rayon of Azerbaijan. He went to secondary school in Tatarly village from 1975 to 1985. He served in the Soviet Army in 1985, and completed his military service in 1987. At the same year, he was admitted to the Ganja Mechanical Engineering College from which he graduated in 1989 and started to work at the Ganja Mechanical Engineering Plant.

== Nagorno Karabakh war ==
When the Armenian invaders attacked the territory of Azerbaijan, Ojaqverdiyev voluntarily went to the frontline and joined the ranks of Azerbaijani army. He participated in several battles around Khojaly District. He died a battle on 5 May 1992.

== Awards ==
Sarkhan Ojaqverdiyev was posthumously awarded the title of "National Hero of Azerbaijan" by Presidential Decree No. 833 dated 7 June 1992.

== Memorial ==
The secondary school that he studied at is named after him.

== See also ==
- First Nagorno-Karabakh War
- List of National Heroes of Azerbaijan

== Sources ==
- Vugar Asgarov. Azərbaycanın Milli Qəhrəmanları (Yenidən işlənmiş II nəşr). Bakı: "Dərələyəz-M", 2010, səh. 234.
