= Goranlı =

Goranly
- Municipality
- Azerbaijani: Goranlı
- Location within Azerbaijan
- Coordinates: 40°41′52″N 46°45′04″E
- Country: Azerbaijan
- District: Goranboy

Population
  - Total: 553
- Time zone: UTC+4 (AZT)
  - Summer (DST): UTC+5 (AZT)

Goranlı (also, Goranly) is a village and municipality in the Goranboy District of Azerbaijan. It has a population of 553. The municipality consists of the villages of Goranly and Gazanchy.
