= Bill Ripper =

Australian rules footballer, born 1912

Personal information
- Full name: William Dudley Ripper
- Born: 10 December 1912; Northcote, Victoria
- Died: 7 August 1992 (aged 79); Geelong, Victoria
- Original team: South Bendigo
- Height: 175 cm (5 ft 9 in)
- Weight: 76 kg (168 lb)

Playing career^{1}
Years	Club	Games (Goals)
1935	Richmond	4 (0)
1936	Hawthorn	10 (15)
Total		14 (15)
- ^{1} Playing statistics correct to the end of 1936.

William Dudley Ripper (10 December 1912 – 7 August 1992) was an Australian rules footballer who played with Richmond and Hawthorn in the Victorian Football League (VFL).

Ripper later served in the Australian Army during World War II.
