= Gülablı =

Gülablı Abdal-Gülablı
- Location within Azerbaijan Location within Karabakh Economic Region
- Coordinates: 39°52′51″N 46°56′50″E
- Country: Azerbaijan
- District: Aghdam

Population (2015)
  - Total: 306
- Time zone: UTC+4 (AZT)

Gülablı (Azerbaijani pronunciation: [ɟylɑbˈlɯ]), also known as Abdal-Gülablı (pronounced [ɑbˈdɑl ɟylɑbˈlɯ]), is a village in the Aghdam District of Azerbaijan.

== History ==
Gülablı was part of the Shusha Uyezd of Elisabethpol Governorate during the Russian Empire. According to 1886 census data, there were 250 homes and 1,412 Azerbaijanis (classified as "Tatars" in the census) of the Shiite branch of Islam in Gülablı. According to the 1912 "Caucasian Calendar", the village of Gülablı was home to 2,211 people, the majority of whom were Azerbaijanis (classified as "Tatars" in the census).

Gülablı was part of the village council of the same name in the Aghdam District of the Azerbaijan SSR during the early Soviet period in 1933. The village had 421 farms and a total population of 1,835 people. The population of the village council, which also included the village of Abdal, was 100 percent Azerbaijani.

The village had 1,351 residents in 1981. Its residents' main occupations were monoculture, animal husbandry, and sericulture. There was a middle school, a club, a library, a mosque, a medical center, and a communication department in the village.

During the First Nagorno-Karabakh War, on 4 September 1992, Armenian forces occupied the village, forcing the Azerbaijani population to flee. It was later incorporated into the breakaway Republic of Artsakh as part of its Martuni Province, where it was known as Vazgenashen (Armenian: Վազգենաշեն). A UAV was reportedly shot down over the village on 12 September 2011 by the Artsakh Defence Army. Artsakh stated that the UAV belonged to Azerbaijan, while Azerbaijan denied this, stating that the UAV was operated by Israel and was making reconnaissance flights from Armenia to spy on Iran. Gülablı was returned to Azerbaijan on 20 November 2020 as part of the 2020 Nagorno-Karabakh ceasefire agreement.

== Historical heritage sites ==
Among the historical heritage sites in and around the village are kurgans from the Late Bronze and Early Iron Age.

== Demographics ==
Year	Population	Ethnic composition	Source
1886	1,412	100% Tatars (i.e. Azerbaijanis)	Transcaucasian Statistical Committee
1912	2,211	Mainly Tatars	Caucasian Calendar
1933	1,835	100% Azerbaijanis	Statistics of Azerbaijan SSR
1981	1,351		Azerbaijani Soviet Encyclopedia
4 September 1992: Occupation of Gülablı. Expulsion of Azerbaijani population
2005	226	~100% Armenians	NKR census
2015	306	~100% Armenians	NKR estimate

== Notable natives ==
- Ashig Valeh – 18th–19th century Azerbaijani ashug
- Gurban Pirimov – Azerbaijani folk musician and tar player
- Majid Shamkhalov – Azerbaijani actor and playwright
- Jahid Jamal – Azerbaijani honored artist of Russia
- Jeyhun Mirzayev – Azerbaijani actor and film director
- Sakhavat Mammadov - Azerbaijani mugham singer
