= Henry White (footballer, born 1905) =

Australian rules footballer

Personal information
- Full name: Henry White
- Born: 9 July 1905
- Died: 3 March 1992 (aged 86)
- Original team: Prahran Juniors

Playing career^{1}
Years	Club	Games (Goals)
1924	St Kilda	1 (0)
- ^{1} Playing statistics correct to the end of 1924.

Henry White (9 July 1905 – 3 March 1992) was an Australian rules footballer who played with St Kilda in the Victorian Football League (VFL).
