= Todan =

- Municipality
- Location within Azerbaijan
- Coordinates: 40°28′19″N 46°27′01″E
- Country: Azerbaijan
- District: Goranboy

Population
  - Total: 921
- Time zone: UTC+4 (AZT)

Todan is a village and municipality in the Goranboy District of Azerbaijan.
