= Navy oceanographic meteorological automatic device =

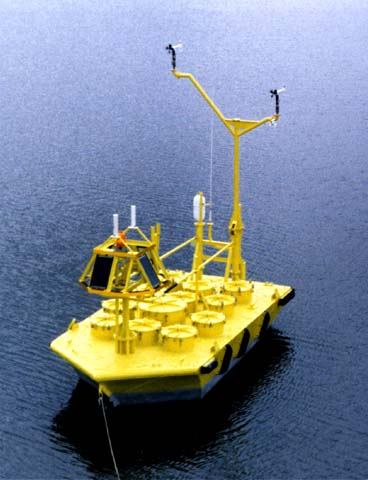
A 6-meter NOMAD anchored at sea.

The Navy oceanographic meteorological automatic device (NOMAD) is an anchored automated weather station developed shortly after World War II and still used today.

== Advantages ==
The NOMAD has a boat-shaped hull made from aluminum, and it provides relatively high cost-effectiveness and excellent long-term survivability in severe weather. NOMAD buoys are highly directional and have a quick rotational response and stability. There have been no known capsizings of 6-meter (20 ft) NOMAD hulls. The relatively small size of the NOMAD allows for easy transport across land.

== Development ==
The NOMAD hull was developed from the "Roberts buoy," which was a 6.67-foot-long (2.03 m), 400-pound (181 kg) boat-shaped buoy developed in the early 1940s by the United States Coast and Geodetic Survey to measure strong tidal currents. The buoy's performance was satisfactory, but its limited size significantly restricted its use in other areas.

In July 1946, the United States Navy's Bureau of Ships became involved in a program to develop automatic weather station buoys. As a prospective part of this program, they conducted a preliminary investigation of the feasibility of mooring a buoy. The investigation concluded that the buoy's hull size was of insufficient length to be moored in 3,600 feet (1,097 m) of water. To support such a mooring, a similarly shaped hull had to be 20 feet (6.1 m) long and displace approximately 20,000 pounds (9,072 kg). This was to become the prototype of the buoy now known as the NOMAD.

The NOMAD was the first of such stations to be anchored successfully for a substantial period in more than 11,000 feet (3,353 m) of water. It was also the first anchored automated station to detect the formation of a hurricane and alert weather observers on land. The station was developed as part of the ocean test and evaluation program, started in 1957, for the U.S. Navy's Bureau of Naval Weapons, with the National Bureau of Standards responsible for technical direction.

== Use ==
Today, the NOMAD is used for monitoring meteorological, oceanographic, and water quality parameters all over the world. As of 2010, the U.S. National Weather Service had 17 NOMADs in operation. NOMADs have also been used by the Meteorological Service of Canada for over 25 years and there are now three NOMADs monitoring Canadian waters.
