= Dave Snowden (baseball) =

American baseball player

- Pitcher
- Born: February 11, 1898; Bunkie, Louisiana
- Died: March 14, 1992 (aged 94); Port Arthur, Texas
- Threw: Right

Negro league baseball debut
- 1933, for the Detroit Stars

Last appearance
- 1933, for the Detroit Stars

Teams
- Detroit Stars (1933)

David Snowden (February 11, 1898 – March 14, 1992) was an American Negro league pitcher in the 1930s.

A native of Bunkie, Louisiana, Snowden played for the Detroit Stars in 1933. In seven recorded games on the mound, he posted a 6.39 ERA over 38 innings. Snowden died in Port Arthur, Texas in 1992 at age 94.
