= Basil Smith =

Australian rules footballer, born 1901

Personal information
- Full name: Basil Hazelwood Smith
- Born: 21 December 1901; Warrnambool, Victoria
- Died: 28 August 1992 (aged 90); Albert Park, Victoria
- Original team: Warrnambool
- Height: 183 cm (6 ft 0 in)
- Weight: 83 kg (183 lb)

Playing career^{1}
Years	Club	Games (Goals)
1922	South Melbourne	6 (5)
1924	Richmond	10 (6)
Total		16 (11)
- ^{1} Playing statistics correct to the end of 1924.

Basil Hazelwood Smith (21 December 1901 – 28 August 1992) was an Australian rules footballer who played for the South Melbourne Football Club and Richmond Football Club in the Victorian Football League (VFL).

In 1925, Smith was appointed as coach of the Albury Football Club.

In 1926, Smith played with the Prahran Football Club.
