= Cyril O'Brien =

Australian rules footballer, born 1912

Personal information
- Full name: Cyril James O'Brien
- Born: 26 August 1912; Koroit, Victoria
- Died: 19 March 1992 (aged 79)
- Height: 183 cm (6 ft 0 in)
- Weight: 83 kg (183 lb)

Playing career^{1}
Years	Club	Games (Goals)
1936	Richmond	9 (0)
- ^{1} Playing statistics correct to the end of 1936.

Cyril James O'Brien (26 August 1912 – 19 March 1992) was an Australian rules footballer who played with Richmond in the Victorian Football League (VFL).

O'Brien later served as a staff sergeant in the Australian Army during World War II.
