= Henning Jensen (footballer, born 1910) =

Danish footballer

Personal information
- Date of birth: 10 April 1910
- Date of death: 21 August 1992 (aged 82)

International career
Years	Team	Apps	(Gls)
1931–1932	Denmark	3	(0)

Henning Jensen (10 April 1910 – 21 August 1992) was a Danish footballer. He played in three matches for the Denmark national football team from 1931 to 1932.
