= Florence van Straten =

American physicist and meteorologist (1913–1992)

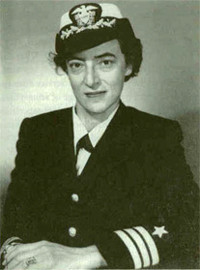
- Florence van Straten during her service in the U.S. Navy
- Born: 1913; Darien, Connecticut
- Died: March 25, 1992 (aged 78)
- Education: New York University, Massachusetts Institute of Technology
- Scientific career
- Fields: Naval aerology
- Workplaces: Naval Weather Service

Florence "Flossie" van Straten (1913–1992) was an aerological engineer known for advancing the science of naval meteorology during and after World War II.

== Life ==
Van Straten was born in 1913 in Darien, Connecticut, the daughter of Dutch immigrants. Her mother spoke six languages and was the highest paid officer in the Netherlands before she came over to the United States. Jacques van Straten, her father, worked for the world-famous movie company, Metro-Goldwyn-Mayer, with its main offices located in New York City. His work for MGM often took him to foreign countries, which gave her the opportunity to travel. She spent a school year abroad, in Nice, France, where she improved her French. She was already as proficient in Dutch, German, Italian, and Spanish.

Van Straten had initially wanted to be a writer, but enrolled in New York University (NYU) and earned her degree in Chemistry instead. She followed by a Master and received a PhD in physical chemistry at NYU in 1939 where she taught Chemistry until 1942.

After the attack on Pearl Harbor (in December 1941), the Navy trained increasing numbers of weather personnel, including several hundred women, to meet the demands of a rapidly expanding force. In 1942 the Navy created the Women Accepted for Volunteer Emergency Service (WAVES) program. One of the earliest volunteers was van Straten, who was immediately assigned to the Naval Aerology Service. She was then trained as a weather forecaster at the Massachusetts Institute of Technology (MTI).

Lt. van Straten, who had no previous military experience, spent the war at Weather Central in Washington, initially analyzing the use of weather in combat operations in the Pacific. She also wrote the report on the Marshalls–Gilberts raids, tactical airstrikes over islands in Micronesia. The purpose of the reports was to “form a basis for a better understanding of the applications of weather information to future operations.” Later, van Straten transferred to the R & D section, where she worked for the rest of the war on radar and other new technologies.

By 1943, van Straten had been assigned to the headquarters staff, the Aerology section of the Bureau of Aeronautics, where she worked in the Operational Analysis Section. Here she compiled extensive analyses of the effects of weather on naval operations, from both historical sources and more recent naval actions.

In 1946, she became a civilian adviser to the Chief of Naval Operations. After the war, van Straten continued to work for the Naval Weather Service as a civilian atmospheric physicist where her analytical work on the conditions of the upper atmosphere assisted in the development of long-range missile technology.

From 1948 to 1962, she headed the technical requirements section, describing her position as the “application of environmental factors to military operations.” In 1958 she was named the ‘Woman of the Year’ by the women’s wing of the Aero Medical Society of America. She retired in 1962 after 16 years as head of the technical requirements branch of the Naval Weather Service, but continued as a consultant to the Navy on atmospheric physics until 1973. She died of cancer at the age of 78, on March 25, 1992, at her home in Bethesda, Maryland.

== Research contributions ==
Van Straten's reports provided examples of how military forces were able to use weather conditions to their advantage, but they also provided examples in which the weather was ignored, to the detriment of the participants. The battle of the Coral Sea in May 1942 was such an instance. The American fleet used the clouds and precipitation of a trailing frontal system to provide cover, slipping out to attack the exposed Japanese naval force and then disappearing again into the heavy weather. In this way they were able to sink the Japanese aircraft carrier Shōhō, seriously damaged another carrier, and shoot down numerous enemy planes. But when they departed the frontal zone to operate in fair weather, they immediately lost the carrier USS Lexington.

Van Straten helped develop methods of using weather phenomena, such as storms, in the planning of ship maneuvers and carrier-based airplane flights. Her work also included development of a technique to modify clouds and produce rain by injecting carbon black into the atmosphere. As a weather trouble-shooter for the Navy, she dealt with problems ranging from fog to radioactive fallout. She also developed a radar facsimile system and patented a sonic device for preventing ice buildup on planes.

She was instrumental in the development of the rocketsonde, which launched a data-collecting package, called a radiosonde, into the upper atmosphere. It was at her suggestion that meteorological data be used in planning the trajectory of rocket launches. She also developed the constant-altitude weather balloon. The deflated balloon was carried aloft by a bubble of helium. The balloon inflated as the atmosphere became thinner until it was full, at which point its altitude remained constant. She also contributed to the development of the floating weather station the Navy Oceanographic Meteorological Automatic Device (NOMAD).

She also contributed to the development of the weather instrument shelter, that protects sensitive instruments from the elements, and the tipping bucket rain gauge which tipped with every 1/100 inch of precipitation and automatically recorded the action at the station.

== Selected works ==
- "Weather or Not". Science Education 53 (2): 181. 1969. doi:10.1002/sce.3730530269. ISSN 0036-8326.
- Aerology and Amphibious Warfare Series (9 books). Chief of Naval Operations Aerology Section. Washington, D.C.:1944
- Aerology and Naval Warfare Series (4 books). Chief of Naval Operations Aerology Section. Washington, D.C.:1945
