= Ghazanchi =

Village in Shirak, Armenia

Ghazanchi Ղազանչի
- Location within Armenia Location within Shirak
- Coordinates: 41°04′44″N 43°49′18″E
- Country: Armenia
- Province: Shirak
- Municipality: Ashotsk
- Elevation: 2,030 m (6,660 ft)

Population (2011)
  - Total: 502
- Time zone: UTC+4
  - Summer (DST): UTC+5

Ghazanchi (Armenian: Ղազանչի) is a village in the Ashotsk Municipality of the Shirak Province of Armenia.

== Demographics ==
Historical population
Year	Pop.	±% p.a.
1873	351	—
1897	786	+3.42%
1926	1,152	+1.33%
1939	1,408	+1.56%
1959	828	−2.62%
1970	558	−3.52%
1979	564	+0.12%
2001	571	+0.06%
2011	502	−1.28%
