= Tural Humbatov =

Azerbaijani footballer (born 1994)

Personal information
- Full name: Tural Humbatovich Humbatov
- Date of birth: 24 January 1994 (age 32)
- Place of birth: Saint Petersburg, Russia
- Height: 1.81 m (5 ft 11 in)
- Position: Defender

Youth career
- Zenit

Senior career*
Years	Team	Apps	(Gls)
2013	Nistru	8	(0)
2014	Araz-Naxçıvan	4	(0)
2015	Keşla	1	(0)
2015-2017	Shuvalan	52	(2)
2017	Pobeda	7	(0)
2018	Dečić	2	(0)
- * Club domestic league appearances and goals

Tural Humbatovich Humbatov (Russian: Турал Гумбатович Гумбатов; Azerbaijani: Tural Hümbətov; born 24 January 1994) is an Azerbaijani former footballer who is last known to have played as a defender for Dečić.

== Career ==
Before the second half of 2012/13, Humbatov signed for Moldovan side Nistru from the youth academy of Zenit, one of Russia's most successful clubs, where he made 8 league appearances and scored 0 goals.

In 2015, Humbatov signed for Shuvalan in Azerbaijan, where he made 52 league appearances and scored 2 goals.

In 2017, he signed for Macedonian team Pobeda after trialing for Rostov in the Russian top flight.

Before the second half of 2017/18, Humbatov signed for Dečić in Montenegro after receiving offers from Slovenia and Greece.
