= Van Straaten =

van Straaten is a Dutch and Afrikaans surname. Notable people with the surname include:

- Braam van Straaten (born 1971), South African rugby union player
- Harmen van Straaten, Dutch author and illustrator
- J. Keith van Straaten (born 1971), American actor and television host
- Peter van Straaten, Dutch cartoonist
- Werenfried van Straaten (1913–2003), Dutch Roman Catholic priest
- Tess van Straaten, Canadian actor, television reporter/news anchor and magazine writer.
