= Kutakan =

Village in Gegharkunik, Armenia

Kutakan Կուտական
- Location within Armenia Location within Gegharkunik
- Coordinates: 40°16′04″N 45°50′21″E
- Country: Armenia
- Province: Gegharkunik
- Municipality: Vardenis

Population (2011)
  - Total: 288
- Time zone: UTC+4 (AMT)

Kutakan (Armenian: Կուտական) is a village in the Vardenis Municipality of the Gegharkunik Province of Armenia.

== History ==
The village was populated by Azerbaijanis before the exodus of Azerbaijanis from Armenia after the outbreak of the Nagorno-Karabakh conflict. In 1988-1989 Armenian refugees from Azerbaijan settled in the village.

== Municipal administration ==
The Kutakan community also includes the nearby village of Zariver.
