= Papravənd =

- Location within Azerbaijan
- Coordinates: 40°09′30″N 46°50′30″E
- Country: Azerbaijan
- District: Aghdam
- Time zone: UTC+4 (AZT)

Papravand (Azerbaijani: Papravənd) is a village situated in Aghdam District of Azerbaijan. It is located 21 km north of the district centre of Aghdam on a foothill plain.

== History ==
In the years of the Russian Empire, the village of Papravend was part of the Javanshir district of the Elizavetpol province. According to the "Caucasian Calendar" of 1912, the village had a population of 448 people, primarily Tatars, later known as Azerbaijanis.

According to the results of the Azerbaijani agricultural census of 1921, the village of Papravend was part of the Kabarda Boy Ahmedli rural community of Javanshir district, Azerbaijan SSR. The population was 920 people (155 households), the predominant nationality being Azerbaijani Turks (Azerbaijanis).

After the administrative reform division and the abolition of districts in 1929, it became part of Aghdam district, Azerbaijan SSR. According to the 1983 census conducted in the Azerbaijan SSR, the population of the village was 1,531.

After the end of the Second Karabakh War, a ceasefire agreement was signed under the terms of which the entire territory Aghdam district was returned to Azerbaijan on 20 November 2020.

== Sights ==
The village is home for a mausoleum, which according to Azerbaijani Researchers K.Mammadzade, N.Guliyev and V.Kerimov, dates back to the 14th century. The plan of this mausoleum, considered a unique monument of medieval architecture, is also typical for the 16th century.

The Papravend Mosque, an 18th-century historical and architectural monument, is located in the village of Papravend. After the Armenian occupation, the mosque was completely destroyed.

== Notable people ==
- Faig Aghayev — National Hero of Azerbaijan.
- Ramiz Abbasli — Azerbaijani author, translator of fiction.
