= Heinrich Eckstein =

German politician (1907–1992)

Member of the Bundestag; for Bersenbrück – Lingen
- In office 7 September 1949 – 15 October 1957
- Preceded by: Constituency established
- Succeeded by: Clemens Hesemann

Personal details
- Born: 9 May 1907 Autenhausen, Germany
- Died: 6 August 1992 (aged 85) Aschaffenburg, Germany
- Party: Christian Democratic Union

Heinrich Eckstein (May 9, 1907 – August 6, 1992) was a German politician of the Christian Democratic Union (CDU) and former member of the German Bundestag.

== Political career ==
He was a member of the German Bundestag from the first federal elections in 1949 to 1957. He was elected directly to parliament in the constituency of Bersenbrück-Lingen in 1949 and 1953.

== Literature ==
Herbst, Ludolf; Jahn, Bruno (2002). Vierhaus, Rudolf (ed.). Biographisches Handbuch der Mitglieder des Deutschen Bundestages. 1949–2002 [Biographical Handbook of the Members of the German Bundestag. 1949–2002] (in German). München: De Gruyter - De Gruyter Saur. p. 1715. ISBN 978-3-11-184511-1.
