= Gordon Goldsmith =

Australian rules footballer

Personal information
- Full name: Gordon Goldsmith
- Born: 21 December 1915
- Died: 24 August 1992 (aged 76)
- Height: 175 cm (5 ft 9 in)
- Weight: 72 kg (159 lb)

Playing career^{1}
Years	Club	Games (Goals)
1936, 1942–43	South Melbourne	13 (5)
1943	Hawthorn	5 (3)
Total		18 (8)
- ^{1} Playing statistics correct to the end of 1943.

Gordon Goldsmith (21 December 1915 – 24 August 1992) was an Australian rules footballer who played with South Melbourne and Hawthorn in the Victorian Football League (VFL).
