= Sündü, Absheron =

Sündü
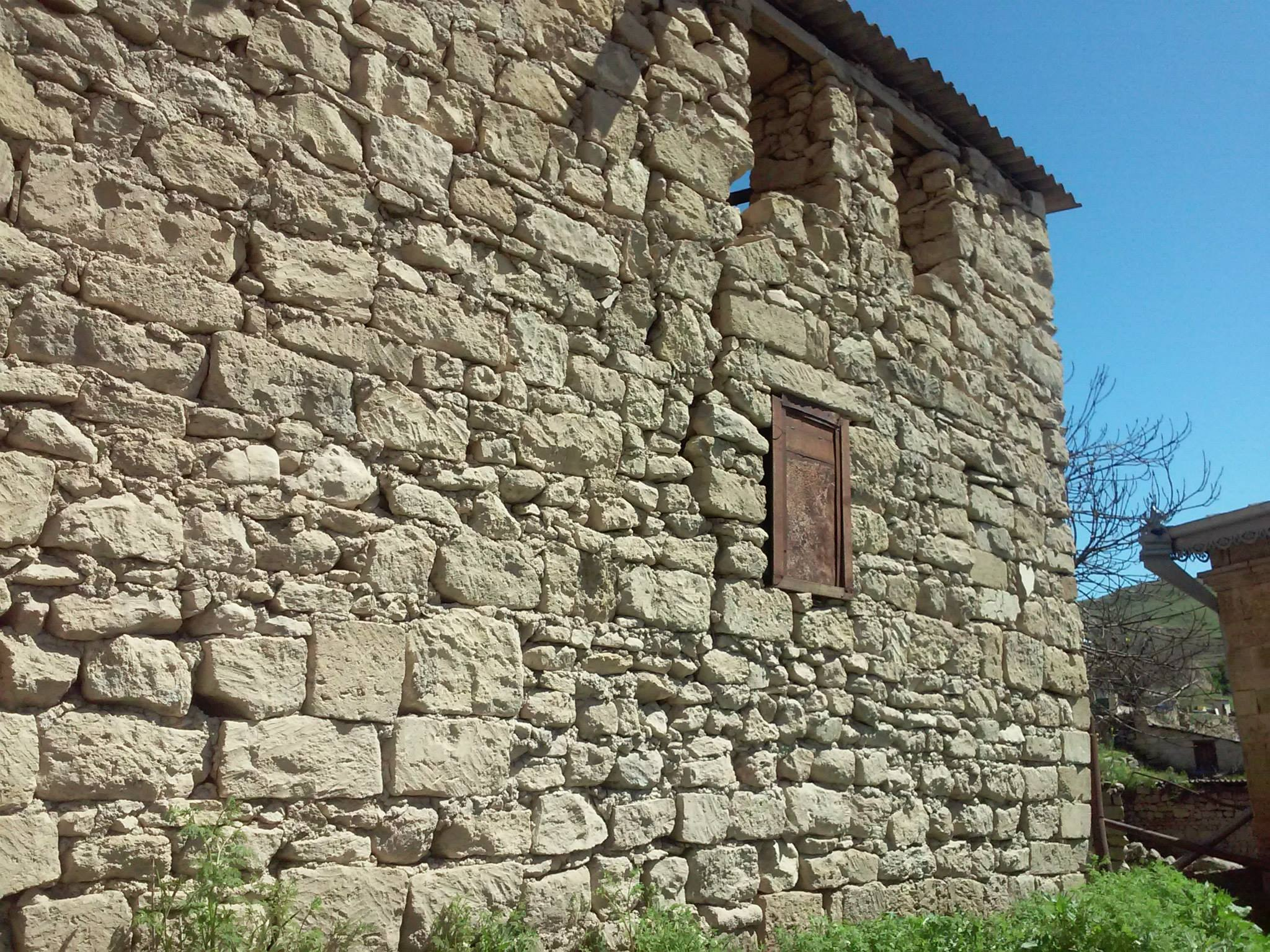

- Location within Azerbaijan
- Coordinates: 40°19′22″N 49°02′46″E
- Country: Azerbaijan
- Rayon: Absheron
- Time zone: UTC+4 (AZT)
  - Summer (DST): UTC+5 (AZT)

Sündü (also, Sundy) is a village in the Absheron Rayon of Azerbaijan.
