= Lachlan Cameron =

Australian rules footballer

Personal information
- Full name: Lochiel Alexander Cameron
- Born: 12 April 1909; Bairnsdale, Victoria
- Died: 18 August 1992 (aged 83)
- Original team: Bairnsdale
- Height: 188 cm (6 ft 2 in)
- Weight: 81 kg (179 lb)

Playing career^{1}
Years	Club	Games (Goals)
1932–1934	Hawthorn	28 (9)
- ^{1} Playing statistics correct to the end of 1934.

Lochiel Alexander Cameron (12 April 1909 – 18 August 1992) was an Australian rules footballer who played with Hawthorn in the Victorian Football League (VFL).
