= Natig Gasimov =

- Born: 2 January 1971
- Military career
- Branch: Azerbaijani Army
- Unit: Azerbaijani Armed Forces
- Conflicts: First Nagorno-Karabakh War
- Awards: Gold Star Medal (Azerbaijan)

Natig Gasimov (January 2, 1971, Kichic Karamurad, Gadabay district - March 1992, Pirler, Khojaly district) was a First Nagorno-Karabakh War fighter and National Hero of Azerbaijan.

== Biography ==
Gasimov Natig Salim oglu was born on January 2, 1971, in the village of Kichic Garamurad of Gedebay district. In 1975, he moved to Mingachevir with his family. After graduating from eight-year school, he studied at a vocational school specializing in welding. After completing his duty in the Internal Troops in the Krasnoyarsk region of Russia, he returned to Azerbaijan in 1991 and went to the front as a volunteer in the same year.

He was captured in the church in Pirler village of Khojaly in 1992.

On June 25, 2024, he was awarded with the title "National Hero of Azerbaijan".

== Films ==
Natiq Qasımov - The film was shot with the support of the Ministry of Culture and Tourism of the Republic of Azerbaijan. The documentary film was shot at the "Azerbaijanfilm" film studio named after Cafer Cabbarlı.

Oğul - The film tells the story of the search for prisoner of war Natig Gasimov, who disappeared during the Nagorno-Karabakh conflict in 1992. The cinematographer of the film is Simon Stanford. In the 46-minute film shot in 2021, the performance of Azerbaijani actors was also used to reflect reality. The film's launch took place on February 28 at Nizami Cinema Center. In addition to the creative team, Natig Gasimov's family also attended the presentation. According to "Qafqazinfo", the film was shot by the British company "Broken Pot Media" and the director and screenwriter of the film, Karan Singh, interviewed witnesses in Armenia, Azerbaijan, Italy, England and Russia for three years.
