= Pete Jones (baseball) =

American baseball player

- Catcher
- Born: July 15, 1919; Charles City, Virginia
- Died: March 26, 1992 (aged 72); Charles City, Virginia

Negro league baseball debut
- 1946, for the Philadelphia Stars

Last appearance
- 1946, for the Philadelphia Stars

Teams
- Philadelphia Stars (1946)

Thomas Everett "Pete" Jones Jr. (July 15, 1919 – March 26, 1992) was an American Negro league catcher in the 1940s.

A native of Charles City, Virginia, Jones played for the Philadelphia Stars in 1946. In seven recorded games, he posted three hits in 13 plate appearances. Jones died in Charles City in 1992 at age 72.
