= Fergus Yeates =

Australian cricketer

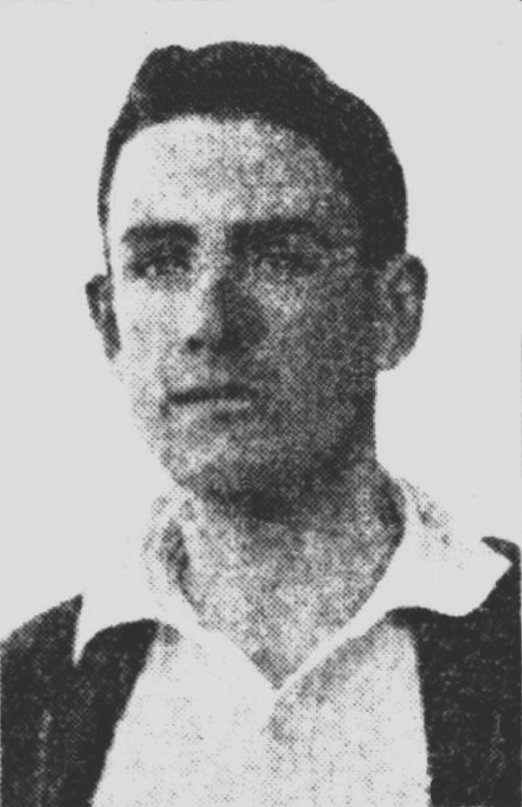

Personal information
- Full name: Sidney Fergus Macrae Yeates
- Born: 20 August 1912; Toowoomba, Queensland
- Died: 19 March 1992 (aged 79); Auchenflower, Queensland
- Batting: Right-handed
- Bowling: Leg-break, googly

Domestic team information
- Years: Team
- 1933/34: Queensland
- Source: ESPNcricinfo, 8 December 2015

Sidney Fergus Macrae Yeates (20 August 1912 – 19 March 1992) was an Australian cricketer. He was a right-handed batsman and leg-break, googly bowler. He played 3 first-class cricket matches for Queensland between 1933 and 1934, scoring 46 runs and taking 6 wickets.
