= Meghrashen =

Meghrashen Մեղրաշեն
- Location within Armenia Location within Shirak
- Coordinates: 40°40′33″N 43°56′55″E
- Country: Armenia
- Province: Shirak
- Municipality: Artik

Population (2011)
  - Total: 1,435
- Time zone: UTC+4
  - Summer (DST): UTC+5

Meghrashen (Armenian: Մեղրաշեն) is a village in the Artik Municipality of the Shirak Province of Armenia.

== Demographics ==
Historical population
Year	Pop.	±% p.a.
1831	269	—
1897	1,018	+2.04%
1926	1,424	+1.16%
1939	1,244	−1.03%
1959	1,057	−0.81%
1970	1,061	+0.03%
1979	1,066	+0.05%
2001	1,272	+0.81%
2011	1,435	+1.21%
