= Qazançı, Goranboy =

Gazanchy
- Azerbaijani: Qazançı
- Location within Azerbaijan
- Coordinates: 40°40′35″N 46°43′17″E
- Country: Azerbaijan
- District: Goranboy
- Municipality: Goranly
- Time zone: UTC+4 (AZT)
  - Summer (DST): UTC+5 (AZT)

Qazançı (also, Gazanchy and Gazanchi) is a village in the Goranboy District of Azerbaijan. The village forms part of the municipality of Goranly.
