= Qazançı, Agdam =

Gazanchy
- Azerbaijani: Qazançı
- Location within Azerbaijan Location within Karabakh Economic Region
- Coordinates: 40°04′11″N 46°44′41″E
- Country: Azerbaijan
- District: Agdam
- Time zone: UTC+4 (AZT)
  - Summer (DST): UTC+5 (AZT)

Qazançı (Armenian: Ղազանճի, also, Gazanchy, Gazanchi, and Ghazanchy) is a village in the Agdam District of Azerbaijan.
