= Safiyar Behbudov =

- Born: June 14, 1967; Barda, Azerbaijan
- Died: March 21, 1992 (aged 24); Aghdam, Azerbaijan
- Military career
- Allegiance: Republic of Azerbaijan
- Rank: Lieutenant
- Conflicts: First Nagorno-Karabakh War
- Awards: National Hero of Azerbaijan; 1992

Safiyar Behbudov (Azerbaijani: Behbudov Səfiyar Abuzər oğlu) (14 June 1967, in Barda, Azerbaijan – 21 March 1992, in Aghdam, Azerbaijan) was an Azerbaijani officer, the National Hero of Azerbaijan, and the warrior of the First Nagorno-Karabakh War.

== Life ==
He was born on 14 June 1967, in Mollalı village of Barda region. He went to the Barda city secondary school No. 6 in 1984, and then, he was drafted to the military service in the Soviet Army. After completing his military service, he graduated from the officer course with a rank of Lieutenant and became an active participant of the 1988 National Liberation Movement. He founded “Soy” Democratic Youth Organization in Barda and gathered young people from the town around him. A week after the Khojaly massacre, he joined Barda self-defense battalion without hesitation. After participation in several successful operations in the Terter region, his unit commander sent his troop to fight in the direction of Aghdam.

== Military activities ==
On March 11, 1992, Armenian soldiers suddenly attacked the positions of Azerbaijani army near Askeran and surrounded the area completely. Safiyar, who fought in battle with his PDM, successfully overthrew the resistance of the enemy and then, they moved towards Askeran.

He faced with the strong military force of the Armenians in the place called Garagha, but did not retreat. After the fight, he was severely wounded and captured by the Armenian soldiers. Even though he underwent severe tortures in the captivity, he did not tell anything about his army's military secrets. After ten days in the captivity, he was killed by the Armenian soldiers. The Armenian side only returned his body on 21 March 1992, with the help of the Aghdam Regional Militia Department.

== Memorial ==
Behbudov was posthumously awarded the title of "National Hero of Azerbaijan" by the decree of the president of the Republic of Azerbaijan dated June 7, 1992, No 833.

He was buried in Mollalı village of Barda region. The secondary school No. 6 is named after him.

== Sources ==
- Vüqar Əsgərov. "Azərbaycanın Milli Qəhrəmanları" (Yenidən işlənmiş II nəşr). Bakı: "Dərələyəz-M", 2010, səh. 53.
