= Sündü, Gobustan =

Sündü
- Municipality
- Location within Azerbaijan
- Coordinates: 40°37′36″N 48°49′55″E
- Country: Azerbaijan
- Rayon: Gobustan

Population
  - Total: 2,682
- Time zone: UTC+4 (AZT)
  - Summer (DST): UTC+5 (AZT)

Sündü (also, Syundi and Syundyu) is a village and municipality in the Gobustan Rayon of Azerbaijan. It has a population of 2,682.
