= Elgiz Karimov =

- Born: January 5, 1971; Barda District, Azerbaijan
- Died: March 12, 1992 (aged 21); Nakhichevanik, Khojaly District, Azerbaijan
- Military career
- Allegiance: Republic of Azerbaijan
- Conflicts: First Nagorno-Karabakh War
- Awards: National Hero of Azerbaijan; 1992

Elgiz Karimov (Azerbaijani: Elgiz Kərimov) (January 5, 1971, Barda District, Azerbaijan – March 12, 1992, Nakhichevanik, Khojaly District, Azerbaijan) was the National Hero of Azerbaijan, and the warrior of the Karabakh war.

== Life ==
Elgiz Karimov was born on January 5, 1971, in Barda District, Azerbaijan. He was graduated from secondary school in 1987 and called up for military service. When Elgiz completed his military service and returned to Barda, he came back to the frontline voluntarily. In 1991 he was sent to self-defense battalions.

== Military activities ==
Elgiz Karimov participated in battles around Askeran. After this fight, he became so popular in the villages around Askeran. Elgiz Karimov, who had great enthusiasm in all his battles, came to the Nakhchivanli village of Khojali District to rescue the surrounding soldiers of Azerbaijani Army on March 12, 1992. After a hard battle lasting about an hour, the siege of the Armenians was broke out, and the soldiers were released. Elgiz Karimov was killed in this battle.

== Memorial ==
He was posthumously awarded the title of "National Hero of Azerbaijan" by Presidential Decree No. 833 dated 7 June 1992. He was buried in Barda District of Azerbaijan.

== See also ==
- First Nagorno-Karabakh War

== Sources ==
- Vugar Asgarov. Azərbaycanın Milli Qəhrəmanları (Yenidən işlənmiş II nəşr). Bakı: "Dərələyəz-M", 2010, səh. 149.
