= Yunis Najafov =

Azerbaijani military officer and war hero (1967–1992)

- Born: 31 August 1967; Kalbajar District, Azerbaijan SSR, Soviet Union
- Died: 24 August 1992 (aged 24); Vangli, Azerbaijan
- Military career
- Allegiance: Soviet Union; Azerbaijan
- Branch: Soviet Army; Azerbaijani Land Forces
- Service years: 1985–1990; 1991–1992
- Rank: Lieutenant
- Conflicts: First Nagorno-Karabakh War; Siege of Stepanakert; Battle of Shusha (1992)
- Awards: National Hero of Azerbaijan; 1992

Yunis Najafov (Azerbaijani: Yunis İsa oğlu Nəcəfov; 31 August 1967 – 24 August 1992) was an Azerbaijani military officer and war hero in Azerbaijan. He is a posthumous recipient of the National Hero of Azerbaijan, which he was awarded for his actions of valor during the First Nagorno-Karabakh War.

== Early life and education ==
Yunis Najafov was born in the Kalbajar District in the Nagorno-Karabakh region of Azerbaijan on 31 August 1967. In 1975, he went to secondary school in Khanlar District and graduated in 1985.

Following his graduation from high school, Najafov began his military service in the Soviet Army and entered the Baku Higher Military School of Commanders in Baku, the capital of Azerbaijan. He went for further military training at the Chelyabinsk Tank School in Chelyabinsk, Russia, and became a lieutenant in the Soviet Army in 1989.

However, he was discharged from the army in connection to his speeches condemning the violent crackdown in Azerbaijan by Soviet forces in January 1990, known as Black January. After this incident and the independence of Azerbaijan from the Soviet Union in August 1991, Najafov went to the frontline as a volunteer to participate in the First Nagorno-Karabakh War (the first conflict between Armenia and Azerbaijan over the Nagorno-Karabakh region).

== First Nagorno-Karabakh War ==
In 1991, Najafov voluntarily went to the Karabakh front in his home region of Nagorno-Karabakh, and was appointed commander of one of the Azerbaijani army units located there. He participated in several battles during the war and distinguished himself in the defense of villages Karkicahan, Malibeyli, and the town of Shusha.

Nonetheless, Najafov was sent back to Baku to train new recruits and conscripts for the war. But as soon as Lachin and Shusha were attacked by Armenian forces, he returned to the front again. Najafov would soon meet his fate when he was killed in action on 24 August 1992 during the battles in the village of Vangli.

== Honors ==
By Decree of the President of Azerbaijan No. 350 dated 7 December 1992 senior lieutenant Yunis Najafov was posthumously awarded the title of "National Hero of Azerbaijan".

== See also ==
- First Nagorno-Karabakh War
- National Hero of Azerbaijan

== Sources ==
- Vugar Asgarov. Azərbaycanın Milli Qəhrəmanları (Yenidən işlənmiş II nəşr). Bakı: "Dərələyəz-M", 2010, səh. 225.
