= Nəbilər, Shusha =

Village in Shusha, Azerbaijan

Nəbilər
- Location within Azerbaijan Location within Karabakh Economic Region
- Coordinates: 39°42′42.8″N 46°43′30.1″E
- Country: Azerbaijan
- District: Shusha

Population (2015)
  - Total: 190
- Time zone: UTC+4 (AZT)

Nəbilər (Nabilar) is a village in the Shusha District of Azerbaijan.

== History ==
The village was captured by the Armenian forces on 15 May 1991 during the First Nagorno-Karabakh War and was made part of Shushi Province of the self-proclaimed Republic of Artsakh.

During the 2020 Nagorno-Karabakh war, Azerbaijani troops recaptured the village.
