= Aslan Atakishiyev =

Azerbaijan officer

- Born: August 16, 1953; Qubadli District, Azerbaijan
- Died: August 7, 1992 (aged 38); Lachin, Azerbaijan
- Military career
- Allegiance: Republic of Azerbaijan
- Rank: Lieutenant
- Conflicts: First Nagorno-Karabakh War
- Awards: National Hero of Azerbaijan; 1992

Aslan Atakishiyev (Azerbaijani: Aslan Gabil oghlu Atakişiyev) (August 16, 1953, Qubadli District, Azerbaijan – August 7, 1992, Lachin, Azerbaijan) was an Azerbaijani officer, the National Hero of Azerbaijan, and a soldier of the First Nagorno-Karabakh War.

== Biography ==
Aslan Atakishiyev was born on August 16, 1953, in Muradkhanli village of Qubadly district. In 1960, he started school and in 1970, he graduated from school. He served in military service in 1972–1974. In 1977, he entered the Faculty of Philology of the Azerbaijan State University. After graduating in 1981, he began his education job in Qubadly region. When the First Nagorno-Karabakh War began, he was working as a teacher in the school. Aslan left his job and went to the front-line in order to defend his land.

== Military activities ==
After the beginning of the First Nagorno-Karabakh War, Aslan joined the National Army and was appointed deputy commander. He took an active part in the battles for the villages of Mazutlu, Sefiyan and Turklar of Lachin district. On August 7, 1992, he was killed by the enemy during the battle for the Lachin corridor.

== Memorial ==
Atakishiyev was post-humously awarded the title of "National Hero of Azerbaijan" by the decree of the President of the Republic of Azerbaijan dated December 7, 1992.

He was buried in the Martyrs' Lane in Baku.

== See also ==
- First Nagorno-Karabakh War

== Sources ==
- Vüqar Əsgərov. "Azərbaycanın Milli Qəhrəmanları" (Yenidən işlənmiş II nəşr). Bakı: "Dərələyəz-M", 2010, səh. 154.
