= Farhad Humbatov =

Military personnel of Azerbaijan

- Born: September 10, 1968; Arjut, Sisian District
- Died: March 29, 1992 (aged 23); Khankendi, Azerbaijan
- Military career
- Allegiance: Republic of Azerbaijan
- Conflicts: First Nagorno-Karabakh War
- Awards: National Hero of Azerbaijan; 1992

Farhad Humbatov (Azerbaijani: Fərhad Hümbətov) (September 10, 1968, Arjut, Sisian District – March 29, 1992, Khankendi, Azerbaijan) was the National Hero of Azerbaijan, and the warrior of the Karabakh war.

== Life ==
Farhad Humbatov was born on September 10, 1968, in Arjut village of Karakilisa District. In 1983 he graduated from secondary school in his village and entered the vocational school on the specialty of the driver-mechanic. He served his military service first in Chitta and then in Mongolia and was discharged from the army in Irkutsk in 1988.

At that time, Humbatov's parents were often exposed to Armenian aggression and were living in danger like other Azerbaijanis. Despite all the difficulties, he returned to his native village and they moved to Baku with his family. He started his career as a driver in the Consumer Services Department.

== Military activities ==
Farhad was survived by coincidence during the tragedy of Black January on 20 January 1990. That same night, the Soviet armies, with heavy military equipment, entered Baku and attacked the protesters, firing into the crowds.

Farhad was voluntarily sent to military service. He participated in battles around Shusha, Kosalar, and Khankendi on March 7, 1992, and deployed five Armenians targets. On March 29, 1992, Farhad fought with the Armenian armed forces in the vicinity of Khankendi. He saved many wounded soldiers of Azerbaijani Army during this battle. Later in this battle, he was killed in a shootout.

== Memorial ==
He was posthumously awarded the title of "National Hero of Azerbaijan" by Presidential Decree No. 833 dated 7 June 1992. He was buried in the Martyrs' Lane in Baku.

== See also ==
- First Nagorno-Karabakh War

== Sources ==
- Vugar Asgarov. Azərbaycanın Milli Qəhrəmanları (Yenidən işlənmiş II nəşr). Bakı: "Dərələyəz-M", 2010, səh. 118–119.
