= Ballıqaya =

Ballıqaya or Ballykaya may refer to:

- Ballıqaya, Aghdara – a village in the Aghdara District of Azerbaijan
- Ballıqaya, Qubadli – a village in the Qubadli District of Azerbaijan
- Aşağı Ballıqaya – a village in the Goranboy District of Azerbaijan
- Yuxarı Ballıqaya – a village in the Goranboy District of Azerbaijan
