= Qərvənd =

Qərvənd or Karvend may refer to the following villages in Azerbaijan:

- Qərvənd, Agdam
- Qərvənd, Fizuli
- Xan Qərvənd

== See also ==
- Garvand (disambiguation)
- Garavand (disambiguation)
