= Allahverdi Baghirov =

Azerbaijani officer

- Born: 22 April 1946; Aghdam, Azerbaijan SSR, Soviet Union
- Died: 12 June 1992 (aged 46); Aghdam, Azerbaijan
- Cause of death: Anti-tank mine
- Burial place: Aghdam cemetery
- Occupation: Football manager
- Years active: 1976–19??
- Political party: Azerbaijan Popular Front
- Children: 3
- Parent(s): Teymur Baghirov; Zumrud Baghirova
- Military Service
- Allegiance: Azerbaijan
- Service years: 1988–1992
- Rank: Officer
- Commands: Aghdam Detachment
- Conflicts: First Nagorno-Karabakh War
- Awards

Allahverdi Teymur oghlu Baghirov (Azerbaijani: Allahverdi Teymur oğlu Bağırov; April 22, 1946 – June 14, 1992) was an Azerbaijani officer, former leader of the Azerbaijani Popular Front Party of Agdam, head coach of Qarabağ FK and named National Hero of Azerbaijan.

== Early years ==
Baghirov was born into a Muslim family in Aghdam, Azerbaijan SSR. After five daughters, his parents named their long-awaited son Allahverdi, meaning "given by Allah", in keeping with a local Muslim naming custom that expressed gratitude to God for the birth of a son. His paternal grandfather participated in the 1918 Armenian-Muslim clashes in Qubadli District. After graduating from Aghdam Secondary School No. 1 in 1965, Baghirov worked as a coach at the Aghdam Children's and Youth Sports School from 1966 to 1983 and was also involved with the Qarabağ football team. He was appointed head coach of Qarabağ FK in 1976.

== Football career ==
Since childhood Allahverdi was fond of football, athletics and volleyball. He had an important role in victory of Aghdam in various sports interregional competitions during school years and later. He played for Aghdam "Karabakh" (then the team was called "Mehsul"), where he played as a striker under number "5". Allahverdi Baghirov's brother Eldar Baghirov (1951–1991) also played for Qarabagh FK and was a defender. In 1970, Allahverdi Baghirov was captain of Aghdam - Jabrayil match for the "Golden Spike" Cup in Fuzuli.

From 1966 to 1983 Baghirov was the coach of the Agdam Children and Youth Sports School and worked for the "Qarabagh" football club. In 1976, he was appointed the head coach of the club and Azerbaijan took the fourth place with his help in the same year, on the World Unity Championship. In 1991 he took part in match between professional footballers of Qarabagh FK and "Neftchi". The match ended with a score of 1:1, The goal scored in the game belonged to Allahverdi.

Former football player Mushfig Huseynov recalled Allahverdi Baghirov:

My first coach was the late National Hero Allahverdi Baghirov. Allahverdi muallim [teacher] taught us more about being honest than about football. He did a great job of preparing us for independent life. He really was a good example for the players.

According to Zahid Garayev, a former Karabakh player and later Baghirov's comrade-in-arms, Allahverdi was both a very strict and very caring coach. Before every match Baghirov told the players: "Let's play in the morning and win!". He took care of his players, made sure they got everything they needed (food, water, etc.) on time. During away games, Baghirov would check each player's room before going to bed, making sure they were in place and everything was in order. But if any player was late for practice in the morning, Baghirov, according to Garaev, would punish the player and not allow him

== Military service ==
In 1988, he voluntarily enlisted in the Azerbaijani Army in the war against Armenia over Nagorno-Karabakh region. In 1990, Baghirov created his own battalion and rescued many Azerbaijani citizens from Khojaly, while exchanging dead bodies of Azerbaijani soldiers with Armenian soldiers.

=== Participation in Karabakh War ===
Baghirov supported small self-defense groups formed in the villages of Karabakh with financial assistance provided by the people of Aghdam and his own money. He fought in all battles of the Aghdam region. During the war, he was elected chairman of the Popular Front of Agdam. The flag of Independent Azerbaijan for the first time was raised by Allahverdi Baghirov in Aghdam.

In 1988, when an outpost was created between Askeran and Aghdam without authorization of the government, his brother Eldar Baghirov was first volunteer who went there when outposts were created in all villages bordering with Armenians.

In August 1991, Allahverdi was shot in the leg by his childhood associate and childhood friend Jafar Imamaliyev as a result of the conflict, when Baghirov sided with Rahim Gaziyev, the future minister of defense republic.

On October 1, 1991, under the command of Allahverdi Baghirov and his brother Eldar Baghirov, military units of the National Army of Azerbaijan were formed in Agdam. Eldar Baghirov was appointed commander of the Agdam Territorial Self-Defense Battalion No. 845. The battalion of 760 men was called "Sons of the Fatherland." Eldar Baghirov, a member of the Supreme Council of Azerbaijan who signed the ''Act on the State Independence of the Republic of Azerbaijan'' in the same year, was mysteriously killed in front of his sister's house in the 4th district of Baku when he was returning from a meeting of the Supreme Council. After Eldar Baghirov's death, the battalion was given his name, and the battalion commander became Allahverdi Baghırov. Also after the death of Eldar, Allahverdi Baghirov stopped shaving beard. During the war Baghirov had the nickname Goja Gartal ( azerb. Qoca Qartal—Old Eagle).

In January 1992, all the forces and techniques of the Armenians in Naxchivanli village was destroyed by Azerbaijani military units under the command of Allahverdi Baghirov, then progressed to the Askeran fortress with 150 warriors, created the opposite position with the village of Ketuk. It took just two hours for Allahverdi Baghirov's soldiers to complete the operation and replace Armenian flags with Azerbaijani flags. Allahverdi Baghirov was awarded the title of "General Mohammed Asadov" for this operation.

=== Participation in saving Khojaly captives ===
During the Khojaly massacre, the battalion of Allahverdi Baghirov near Askeran managed to save hundreds of residents of the city. Baghirov made a great contribution to the removal of the bodies of those killed during the Khojaly massacre from the battlefield and the release of Azerbaijani prisoners in exchange for the bodies and captives of Armenian soldiers. Allahverdi Baghirov, through Vitaly Balasanyan, commander of the Armenian battalion in Askeran, saved more than 1003 residents of Khojaly from captivity in three days. According to Balasanyan, he handed over 1250 people to the Azerbaijanis. Baghirov received Azerbaijani prisoners at Garagadjy cemetery in Agdam district, brought them by bus and handed them over to their family. It was as a result of Allahverdi Baghirov's talks with Vitaly Balasanyan that military operators Seyidagha Movsumov and Chingiz Mustafayev had the opportunity to film from the site of the Khojaly massacre. Thus, according to the then TV cameraman of the Azerbaijani Defense Ministry, Seyidagha Movsumov, he and the commander of the Agdam battalion, Allahverdi Baghirov, went to the checkpoint on the Askeran road. After negotiations with his opponent, Baghirov met with Balasanyan. It was Allahverdi Baghirov's first meeting with Vitaly Balasanyan on February 28 of 1992, two days after the Khojaly massacre. Baghirov told Balasanyan that his fighters wanted to collect the bodies and carry out video footage. At first Balasanyan did not agree to the shooting, but then Baghirov managed to persuade the Armenian commander; provided that the two Armenian soldiers will follow the Azerbaijanis to the end and no filming will be carried out without their permission. Baghirov agreed, after which Movsumov and several people of Baghirov got into the cars of the Armenian military and together with two trucks drove towards Khojaly. On that day, the fighters of Baghırov battalion were also able to carry the body of the commandant of Khojali airport, Alif Hajiyev. Also that day, at 10 p.m., the first group of Khojali Azerbaijanis, mostly women and children, was sent to Agdam.

Later Balasanyan recalled Baghirov:

Our acquaintance and communication, definitely, have benefited me and him. In those days we solved hundreds of issues. With the help of Allahverdi, we were able to bring back the people who, for one reason or another, found themselves in enemy territory. I managed to get a lot of people out of their prisons. Allahverdi was a very responsible man: there was no case that I called him on any issue, and this issue would not have been resolved. It happened that our wounded guys were on their side, and the radio player reported it to me. I contacted Allahverdi, and we immediately returned the wounded. He didn't allow it to come down to the murder of our people.

Military correspondent Emin Eminbeyli said that one day during the exchange of prisoners Baghirov suddenly hugged one of the Armenian captives and said directly to the camera that for many years he played football with him for the same team. The Armenian soldier replied to Baghirov that he was very hopeful that he would no longer be with him on opposite sides.

== Death ==
On May 3, 1992, Baghirov was able to obtain information that Armenian forces were going to capture Shusha on the 8th. After passing this information to the state authorities, Allahverdi Baghirov summoned five soldiers to the headquarters and together with them began to develop a plan of action.

On June 12, 1992, Baghirov's battalion took part in the capture of the villages of Aranzamin, Nakhichevanik, Dagraz, Mirikend, Pirjamal. He believed that he would be able to reach Khankendi with his battalion. However, on his return from Nakhichevanik after checking the post, the UAS vehicle in which Allahverdi was staying was blown up by an anti-tank mine at the entrance of the village of Aranzamin; three survived, but him and the driver died. Upon learning of Baghirov's death, the commander of the Askeran battalion, Vitaly Balasanyan, contacted the Azerbaijani military on the radio and asked if Allahverdi had really died. When he heard that this was true, Balasanyan was very upset and scolded the Azerbaijanis: "How did you not save such a person?"

By decree No. 476 of February 24, 1993 of the President of the Republic of Azerbaijan, Abulfaz Elchibey, Allahverdi Teymur ogly Baghirov, the commander of the military unit named Eldar Baghirov was posthumously awarded the title of National Hero of Azerbaijan for his personal courage and courage, shown during the protection of the territorial integrity of the Republic of Azerbaijan and the security of the civilian population. The National Hero's Gold Star Medal was presented to Baghirov's wife by Azerbaijani President Heydar Aliyev.

=== Funeral and grave ===
Baghirov was buried in his native Aghdam city, in the city's cemetery. At that time, most of those killed in Karabakh were buried in the Alley of Martyrs in Baku. Immediately after Baghirov's death, a grave was even prepared for him in Alley of Martyrs in Baku, but for certain reasons his family decided to bury Allahverdi next to his brother, Eldar Baghirov, in Aghdam cemetery. And in that same grave in Baku was buried journalist Chingiz Mustafayev, who died a few days after Baghirov. After the capture of the city by Armenian forces, the cemetery was destroyed.

On November 20, Azerbaijani armed forces, in accordance with the ceasefire agreement signed by the heads of Azerbaijan, Armenia and Russia, which ended the Second Nagorno-Karabakh War, entered the territory of the Agdam district, and the President of Azerbaijan Ilham Aliyev announced on live television about the full transition of the area and city of Agdam under the control of the Azerbaijani army. On November 27 the daughters of Allahverdi Baghirov, officers Zumrud Baghirova and Aynur Baghirova, visited their father's grave after 27 years. The grave of the National Hero was beautified

Baghirov Allahverdi Teymur oghlu was awarded the title of "National Hero of Azerbaijan" after his death by the decree of the Azerbaijani President dated February 24, 1993. Later, by the decree of Heydar Aliyev, Allahverdi Baghirov was awarded with “the Golden Star” medal.

== Personal life ==
- First wife - Russian (born in Aghdam; divorced)
  - Son - Elshan Baghirov (born 1972, Agdam)
- Second wife - Valida Baghirova;
  - Daughter - Zumrud Baghirova, Colonel-Lieutenant of the State Border Guard Service of Azerbaijan;
    - Grandson - Ali Alizadeh.
  - Daughter - Aynur Baghirova, captain of medical service of the State Border Service of Azerbaijan.
    - Grandson - Burkhan Pashazadeh.

== See also ==
- Qarabağ FK
- First Nagorno-Karabakh War
