= Çıraqlı =

Çıraqlı or Chirakhly or Chyrakhly or Chyakhly or Chiragly may refer to:

- Çıraqlı, Dashkasan, Azerbaijan
- Çıraqlı, Lachin, Azerbaijan
- Çıraqlı, Shamakhi, Azerbaijan
- Çıraxlı, Agdam, Azerbaijan
