= Asif Maharammov =

Asif Maharramov
- Born: June 26, 1952; Aghdam, Azerbaijan
- Died: July 1, 1994 (aged 42); Yalta, Ukraine
- Military career
- Allegiance: Republic of Azerbaijan
- Service years: 1992-1993
- Rank: Lieutenant Colonel
- Nickname: Fred Asif
- Conflicts: First Nagorno-Karabakh War
- Awards: National Hero of Azerbaijan; 1994

Asif Maharammov (Azerbaijani: Asif Yusif oğlu Məhərrəmov, Russian: Асиф Юсиф оглы Магеррамов June 26, 1952, Aghdam, Azerbaijan - July 1, 1994, Yalta, Ukraine), commonly known as Fred Asif, was an Azerbaijani Lieutenant colonel and National Hero of Azerbaijan.

== Early years ==
Born to an Azerbaijani working-class family in Aghdam, Asif Maharramov was given the nickname "Fred" by his friends in honor of the main character of the Danish film "First Strike, Fred"", which was shown in the "Dostlug" cinema of Aghdam in the 1970s.

== Military service ==
After the events of Black January, Maharramov created voluntary self-defense groups, who with his personal participation rose to defend the Azerbaijani territories.

He was appointed commander of the mine detectors military unit 859 on 7 March 1992 and freed the villages of Aranzəmin, Pirjamal and Dəhrəz from Armenian occupation.

On 24 June 1992, he was badly injured during fight in the village of Naxçıvanlı but returned to front line after recovering from his injuries. However, he forced to quit fighting after his health condition worsened on 27 October 1993.

== Death ==
Maharammov died in Yalta after failing to recover from tuberculosis. He was posthumously awarded the title of the National Hero of Azerbaijan and was buried in the Martyrs' Lane in Baku. His battalion, a street in Baku and a charity foundation are all named after him.

== See also ==
- First Nagorno-Karabakh War
