= Garvand =

Garvand (Persian: گروند, Azerbaijani: Qərvənd), may refer to the following settlements in Iran and Azerbaijan:

- Garvand, Kermanshah
- Garvand, South Khorasan
- Qərvənd, Agdam, Azerbaijan
- Qərvənd, Fizuli, Azerbaijan
- Xan Qərvənd, Goranboy, Azerbaijan

== See also ==
- Garavand (disambiguation)
