= Operation Goranboy =

Military offensive by Azerbaijan

- Part of the First Nagorno-Karabakh War
Date	12 June 1992 – March 1993
Location	Goranboy and Tartar provinces of Azerbaijan Republic
Result	Azerbaijan initially managed to break through the NKR defenses and capture over 48% of former NKAO territory, but failed in their overall strategic goal.

Belligerents
Armenia (Republic of Artsakh) Artsakh	Azerbaijan

Commanders and leaders
(Republic of Artsakh) Manvel Yeghiazaryan	(Azerbaijan) Surat Huseynov (Azerbaijan) Isgandar Hamidov (Azerbaijan) Vladimir Shamanov (Azerbaijan) Rovshan Javadov

Strength
Unknown detachment (Republic of Artsakh) Arabo Detachment "Aramo" detachment "Artziv 9" detachment "Zeytun" detachment "Nikol Duman" detachment "Zoravar Andranik" detachment "Meghradzor" detachment	Additional battalions 110 tanks 70+ BTRs and BMPs

Casualties and losses
20 civilians captured (later all released); The entire ethnic Armenian population of Goranboy fled the region	Unknown

Operation Goranboy was a large-scale military offensive by Azerbaijan in the summer of 1992. Its aims were to take complete control of the entire territory of Nagorno-Karabakh and put a decisive end to the secessionist Nagorno-Karabakh Republic (NKR). This offensive is regarded as a successful breakthrough by the Azerbaijani Army and marked the peak of Azerbaijani success throughout the entire six years of the First Nagorno-Karabakh War.

After Azerbaijan's initial military successes, re-grouped Armenian forces repelled the attack, re-capturing most of the seized regions.

== The offensive ==
On 12 June 1992, just five days after Abulfaz Elchibey of the Popular Front of Azerbaijan was elected the President of Azerbaijan, the Azerbaijani military first launched a large scale diversionary attack from the east, in the direction of the Askeran region at the center of Nagorno-Karabakh. The Azerbaijani troops attacked positions to the north and south of Askeran. As a result of fierce fighting the Azerbaijanis managed to establish control over several settlements in the Askeran region: Nakhichevanik, Dovşanlı, Pirjamal, Dahraz, and Agbulaq.

=== Goranboy ===
On 13 June 1992, Azerbaijan launched the main large-scale three-day offensive against the region of Goranboy (the territory of the former Shahumyan rayon of Azerbaijan SSR) located north of Nagorno-Karabakh, which was defended by the Armenian volunteer detachments. This offensive was code-named Operation Goranboy (named after the rayon that lies to the north of former Nagorno-Karabakh Autonomous Oblast (NKAO)) and headed by Surat Huseynov. As many as 4 tank battalions and 2 mechanized infantry battalions of the 23rd Division of the former Soviet Union Army, as well as 4 additional battalions of the Azerbaijan Army and various brigades from the neighboring regions, were joined in this operation. After 15 hours of fierce fighting against the Azerbaijani forces, the two Armenian detachments withdrew. Azerbaijan managed to capture several dozen villages in the Goranboy region originally held by the Armenian forces, and the entire Armenian civilian population of this region fled. According to a report by the Memorial human rights society, which sent its mission to Goranboy in the aftermath of the operation, there were no civilian casualties, as Armenians had fled the region before the Azerbaijani troops approached them. The population of the neighboring Azerbaijani and Russian villages remained unaffected.

=== Battle of Martakert ===
On July 4, 1992, after a long siege, Azerbaijani forces captured the largest town in the region, Martakert, also known as Aghdara. The Armenian forces left being outnumbered but forced serious casualties and loss of weapons and equipment to Azeri forces. The scale of the Azerbaijani offensive prompted the government of Armenia to openly threaten Azerbaijan that it would overtly intervene and assist the separatists fighting in Karabakh.

According to Robert Kocharyan, by this time Azerbaijan had captured more than 48% of the territory of the former NKAO, creating a situation of panic among Armenians.

== Stalemate ==
On June 18, 1992, a state of emergency was announced throughout the NKR. On August 15, the State Defense Committee of the NKR was created, headed by Robert Kocharyan. Partial mobilization was called for, which covered sergeants and privates in the NKR, NKR men available for military service aged 18–40, officers up to the age of 50 and women with previous military training. The newly conscripted men now numbered 15,000.

The thrust made by the Azerbaijanis ground to a halt when their armor was driven off by helicopter gunships. It was claimed that many of the crew members of the armored units in the Azerbaijani-launched assault were Russians from the 104th Guards Airborne Division based out of Ganja and, ironically enough, so were the units who eventually stopped them. According to an Armenian government official, they were able to persuade Russian military units to bombard and effectively halt the advance within a few days. According to Russian General Lev Rokhlin, Russian effectively supplied Armenians with T-72 tanks and fifty BMP-2 infantry fighting vehicles from its military base in Mozdok in the summer of 1992. Most of the ammunition was flown to Armenia by Antonov An-124 military cargo planes.

== Armenian counter-offensive ==
After the reorganization of the NKR Defense Army, the tide of Azerbaijani advances was stopped. By September–December 1992 Azerbaijan's army was exhausted and suffered heavy losses. Faced with an imminent defeat, Surat Huseynov moved what was left of his army out of Martakert and back to Ganja, where it could be recuperated and restocked by the 104th Guards Airborne Division of the Soviet Airborne Troops. However, after recuperating Huseynov did not march on Aghdara, but on Baku, intending to overthrow President Abulfez Elchibey in a military coup. In February 1993, direct evidence of treason by Azerbaijani Minister of Defense Rahim Gaziyev and Surat Huseynov was found in recorded conversation where Gaziyev was telling Huseynov about deliberate abandoning of Azerbaijani soldiers encircled in Hasanriz village by Armenians to their fate.

== See also ==
- Battle of Aghdam
- Battle of Kelbajar
