= Geran =

Geran may refer to:

== Places ==
- Gëran (disambiguation), either:
  - Gogaran, Armenia
  - Goran, Azerbaijan
- Bardarski Geran, Bulgaria
- Geran, Iran (disambiguation), places in Iran

== People ==
- Elmer H. Geran, American politician
- Gerry Geran, American ice hockey player
- Juliana Geran Pilon, American political scientist

== Technology ==
- Geran-1, Russian version of Shahed 131 drone
- Geran-2, Russian version of Shahed 136 drone
- Geran-3, Russian version of Shahed 238 jet drone
- Geran-4, Russian drone, a development of the Geran-3
- Geran-5, Russian cruise missile
- GERAN, telecommunications standards

== Other ==
- Geran (film), 2019 Malaysian Malay-language drama film
- One of three characters from David Eddings' The Belgariad; see Garion
