= Goranboy =

Goranboy may refer to:

- Goranboy District, an administrative division of Azerbaijan
- Goranboy (city), a city in Azerbaijan
- Operation Goranboy, a military offensive in Goranboy Rayon
