= Rəhimli =

Rəhimli or Rahimli or Ragimly may refer to:

Villages of Azerbaijan :

- Rəhimli, Goranboy, Azerbaijan
- Rəhimli, Davachi, Azerbaijan
- Rəhimli, Gadabay, Azerbaijan
- Rəhimli, Agsu, Azerbaijan
- Rəhimli, Kalbajar, Azerbaijan
