= Garavand =

Garavand or Geravand or Garawand (Persian: گراوند) may refer to:

- Geravand, Kermanshah
- Garavand, Eslamabad-e Gharb, Kermanshah Province
- Garavand-e Bakhtiar, Khuzestan Province
- Garavand-e Sabzi, Khuzestan Province
- Garavand-e Sofla, Khuzestan Province
- Garavand, Lorestan

== See also ==
- Garvand (disambiguation)
