= Kozun =

Kozun may refer to:

- Kozun (surname)
- Kozun, Iran, a village in South Khorasan Province, Iran
