= Hüseynqulular =

Hüseynqulular or Guseynkullar may refer to:

- Hüseynqulular, Gadabay, Azerbaijan
- Hüseynqulular, Tovuz, Azerbaijan
