= Gëran =

Gëran may refer to:

- Gogaran, Armenia
- Goran, Azerbaijan

== See also ==
- Geran (disambiguation)
