= Yerevanlı =

Yerevanlı or Yerevanly may refer to:

- İrəvanlı, Goranboy, Azerbaijan
- İrəvanlı, Tartar, Azerbaijan
- İrəvanlı, Yevlakh, Azerbaijan
