= Veyisli =

- Location within Azerbaijan
- Coordinates: 40°35′09″N 46°43′31″E
- Country: Azerbaijan
- Rayon: Goranboy

Population
  - Total: 1,887
- Time zone: UTC+4 (AZT)
  - Summer (DST): UTC+5 (AZT)

Veyisli is a village and municipality in the Goranboy Rayon of Azerbaijan. It has a population of 1,887.
