= Əlirzalı =

Village in Goranboy Rayon, Azerbaijan

Coordinates: 40°30′N 46°57′E

Əlirzalı is a village and municipality in the Goranboy Rayon of Azerbaijan. It has a population of 1,006.
