= February Uprising =

1921 uprising in Armenia

- Part of Sovietization of Armenia and Southern Front of the Russian Civil War
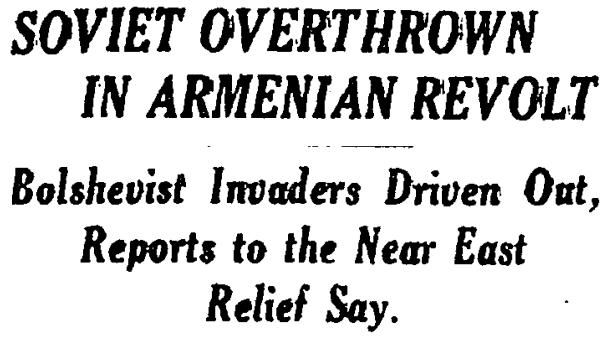
- Headline in The New York Times from March 17, 1921
Date	February – April 1921
Location	Armenia
Result	Soviet victory

Belligerents
Dashnaktsutiun; Mountainous Armenia	(Russian Soviet Federative Socialist Republic) Soviet Russia (Armenian Soviet Socialist Republic) Soviet Armenia

Commanders and leaders
Simon Vratsian; Garegin Nzhdeh; Suren Tarkhanan	(Russian Soviet Federative Socialist Republic) Anatoliy Gekker (Armenian Soviet Socialist Republic) Sarkis Kasyan (Armenian Soviet Socialist Republic) Avis Nurijanyan

Units involved
Salvation Committee of the Fatherland	11th Red Army

Strength
~10,000 (April)	(Russian Soviet Federative Socialist Republic) Unknown

Casualties and losses
Unknown	(Russian Soviet Federative Socialist Republic) 200 (in mid-April, Soviet claim)

The February Uprising (Armenian: Փետրվարյան ապստամբություն, romanized: P’etrvaryan apstambut’yun) (Note: Classical orthography: Փետրուարեան ապստամբութիւն. Called the "February mutiny/sedition" (Փետրվարյան խռովություն, P’etrvaryan khrovut’yun) in Soviet historiography.) was an anti-Bolshevik rebellion by the nationalist Armenian Revolutionary Federation which started on February 13 and was suppressed on April 2, 1921, by the recapture of Yerevan by Bolshevik forces.

== Background ==
After the Republic of Armenia was Sovietized in December 1920, about 1,000 Armenian officers were arrested by the new Bolshevik authorities, including generals Tovmas Nazarbekian and Movses Silikyan. They were forced to walk from Yerevan to Alaverdi by foot (about 160 kilometers) and some of them were killed on the road. These officers were subsequently sent to jails in Baku and Russia. In February 1921, many heroes of the Battle of Sardarabad were shot, including Daniel Bek-Pirumyan, while his brother Poghos Bek-Pirumyan committed suicide after being tortured. Pro-Armenian Revolutionary Federation (ARF, the former ruling party of Armenia) intellectuals were also harassed. Wheat was taken away from villagers without any compensation.

== The uprising ==
The repressions by the Bolshevik government of Armenia created widespread discontent and the Armenian Revolutionary Federation began a rebellion on February 13. By February 17, Ashtarak, Ejmiatsin, Garni, and Hrazdan were taken over by ARF forces. On February 18, they entered Yerevan. The Bolsheviks and the Red Army retreated to Artashat. Hovhannes Katchaznouni, Levon Shant, Nikol Aghbalian, and 100 other political activists and intellectuals were freed from jails.

After the capture of Yerevan, the Salvation Committee of the Fatherland was founded under the leadership of former prime minister Simon Vratsian, which was to govern the country until the formation of a new government. The committee addressed the population on February 18 which called on people to "protect order and rule, [and] strictly fulfill all the orders of the committee". Throughout the 42-day rebellion, bloody battles took places between ARF forces and the Bolsheviks. On February 27, the Bolsheviks tried to attack Yerevan, but they were forced to retreat on March 1. After a two-week pause, Bolshevik units attacked again and took over Artashat on March 16, but the next day ARF forces started an offensive and recaptured the town.

The Bolshevik forces, greatly outnumbering the ARF, began a large offensive on March 24. They captured Aparan and Kotayk and entered Yerevan on April 2. The ARF forces retreated without any serious battle to avoid the destruction of the capital.

== Aftermath ==
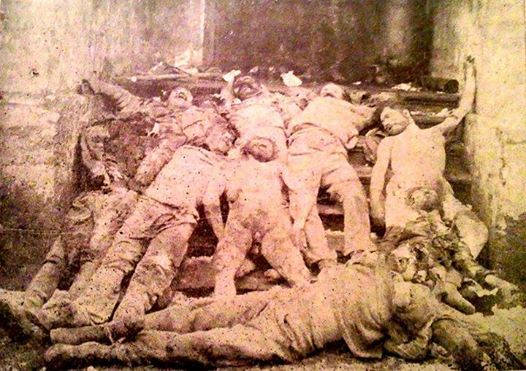
Yerevan prison after Bolshevik slaughter. At the night of 17 February 1921, 50 people were brutally slaughtered at Yerevan prison.

The "Salvation Committee of the Fatherland", ARF forces and many civilians retreated to Zangezur, where they joined Garegin Nzhdeh, where the Republic of Mountainous Armenia was established. The mountain republic held out against the Bolsheviks until July. The Armenian leaders escaped to Persia to avoid arrest and possible execution by the Bolsheviks.

The reasons of the revolt were later discussed by the Bolshevik government and it was decided to treat the population with more tolerance. After suppressing the February Uprising, Alexander Miasnikian was appointed chairman of the Council of People's Commissars of Armenia, the newly installed government of the Armenian Soviet Socialist Republic.

== International reactions ==
On February 18, the Committee sent a message to the Armenian delegation in Paris and to the leaders of world powers (France, United Kingdom, Italy), League of Nations, etc., but it remained unanswered. A message was also sent to the Armenian delegation in Tiflis, Georgia, where after the Sovietization of Armenia, local Armenians were subjected to violence. Georgia responded to the message on February 21, when the Armenian embassy was reopened in Tiflis. Georgia fell to the Soviets on February 25, thereafter the Armenian rebels were left alone against the Bolshevik forces in the Caucasus.
