= Nadirkənd =

- Municipality
- Location within Azerbaijan
- Coordinates: 40°39′17″N 46°38′04″E
- Country: Azerbaijan
- Rayon: Goranboy

Population
  - Total: 1,389
- Time zone: UTC+4 (AZT)
  - Summer (DST): UTC+5 (AZT)

Nadirkənd is a village and municipality in the Goranboy Rayon of Azerbaijan. It has a population of 1,389.
