= Şadılı =

- Municipality
- Location within Azerbaijan
- Coordinates: 40°38′38″N 46°34′48″E
- Country: Azerbaijan
- Rayon: Goranboy

Population
  - Total: 579
- Time zone: UTC+4 (AZT)
  - Summer (DST): UTC+5 (AZT)

Şadılı (also, Shadly and Shadyly) is a village and municipality in the Goranboy Rayon of Azerbaijan. It has a population of 579.
