= Boluslu =

Cinli Boluslu
- Municipality
- Location within Azerbaijan
- Coordinates: 40°37′56″N 46°51′12″E
- Country: Azerbaijan
- Rayon: Goranboy

Population
  - Total: 1,313
- Time zone: UTC+4 (AZT)
  - Summer (DST): UTC+5 (AZT)

Cinli Boluslu (also, Cinli Bo-luslu, Dzhinli-Boluslu, and Dzhinly-Boluslu) is a village and municipality in the Goranboy Rayon of Azerbaijan. It has a population of 1,313.
