= Qurbanzadə =

Qurban
- Municipality
- Location within Azerbaijan
- Coordinates: 40°45′58″N 46°34′07″E
- Country: Azerbaijan
- Rayon: Goranboy

Population
  - Total: 583
- Time zone: UTC+4 (AZT)
  - Summer (DST): UTC+5 (AZT)

Qurbanzadə (also, Kurbanzade) is a village and municipality in the Goranboy Rayon of Azerbaijan. It has a population of 583.
