= Türk-Xoylu =

- Village
- Location within Azerbaijan
- Coordinates: 40°38′N 46°32′E
- Country: Azerbaijan
- Rayon: Goranboy
- Time zone: UTC+4 (AZT)
  - Summer (DST): UTC+5 (AZT)

Türk-Xoylu (also, Tyurk-Khoylu) is a village in the Goranboy Rayon of Azerbaijan.
