= Xoylu =

- Municipality
- Location within Azerbaijan
- Coordinates: 40°38′39″N 46°32′11″E
- Country: Azerbaijan
- Rayon: Goranboy

Population
  - Total: 1,930
- Time zone: UTC+4 (AZT)
  - Summer (DST): UTC+5 (AZT)

Xoylu (also, Khoylu) is a village and municipality in the Goranboy Rayon of Azerbaijan. It sits in the Time zone UTC+4. It has a population of 1,930.
