= Yunis Aliyev =

National Hero of Azerbaijan (1958–1992)

- Born: October 9, 1958; Kyzylgadzhyly, Goranboy, Azerbaijan SSR
- Died: May 5, 1992 (aged 33); Talysh
- Military career
- Allegiance: Republic of Azerbaijan
- Conflicts: First Nagorno-Karabakh War
- Awards: National Hero of Azerbaijan; 1992

Yunis Aliyev (Azerbaijani: Əliyev Yunis Əsgər oğlu; born 9 October 1958 in Kyzylgadzhyly, Goranboy District, Azerbaijan SSR – 5 May 1992, Talysh) was the military serviceman of Azerbaijan Armed Forces, Chief Colonel and warrior during the Nagorno-Karabakh conflict.

== Early life and education ==
In 1973, Aliyev studied at Dash Kyzylgadzhyly village secondary school and then continued his secondary education at School No. 102 in Dalimammadli. In 1976, he was drafted to the Soviet Armed Forces and assigned to Tajikistan.

=== Personal life ===
Aliyev was married and had two children.

== Nagorno Karabakh War ==
In 1992, Aliyev joined the second battalion established in Goranboy District. His first fight against Armenian army was in Aghdara. On 4 May 1992, he prepared a plan called "Yaltahil" to prevent the attacks of Armenians in the Talysh settlement of the Tapqaraqoyunlu village of the Goranboy District. That operation was successful for Azerbaijani soldiers. One day later, Armenian soldiers suddenly attacked the positions of Azerbaijani army. Aliyev was killed during that fight and his body was found only 43 days after the Talish village was released.

== Honors ==
Yunis Asker oglu Aliyev was posthumously awarded the title of the "National Hero of Azerbaijan" by Presidential Decree No. 833 dated 7 June 1992.

He was buried at a cemetery in 1992 in Kyzylgadzhyly village of Goranboy District. Kyzylgadzhyly village kindergarten No. 3 was named after him.

== See also ==
- First Nagorno-Karabakh War
- List of National Heroes of Azerbaijan

== Sources ==
- Vugar Asgarov. Azərbaycanın Milli Qəhrəmanları (Yenidən işlənmiş II nəşr). Bakı: "Dərələyəz-M", 2010, səh. 91.
