= Bəşirli =

Coordinates: 40°43′N 46°37′E

Beshirli (Azerbaijani: Bəşirli) is a village in the municipality of Hazyrahmedli in the Hora voy District of Azerbaijan.
