= Eyvazlılar =

Coordinates: 39°52′N 47°38′E

Eyvazlılar is a village and municipality in the Goranboy Rayon of Azerbaijan. It has a population of 515.
