= Göynüyən =

- Location within Azerbaijan
- Coordinates: 40°44′N 46°36′E
- Country: Azerbaijan
- Rayon: Goranboy
- Municipality: Hazırəhmədli
- Time zone: UTC+4 (AZT)
  - Summer (DST): UTC+5 (AZT)

Göynüyən (also, Gëyniyan) is a village in the Goranboy Rayon of Azerbaijan. The village forms part of the municipality of Hazırəhmədli.
