= Şurakənd, Goranboy =

Şurakənd
- Location within Azerbaijan
- Coordinates: 40°34′21″N 46°47′02″E
- Country: Azerbaijan
- Rayon: Goranboy
- Municipality: Goranboy
- Time zone: UTC+4 (AZT)
  - Summer (DST): UTC+5 (AZT)

Şurakənd (also, Shurakend) is a village in the Goranboy Rayon of Azerbaijan. The village forms part of the municipality of Goranboy.
