= Yəhərçi Qazaxlar =

- Municipality
- Location within Azerbaijan
- Coordinates: 40°45′28″N 46°36′22″E
- Country: Azerbaijan
- Rayon: Goranboy

Population
  - Total: 694
- Time zone: UTC+4 (AZT)
  - Summer (DST): UTC+5 (AZT)

Yəhərçi Qazaxlar (also, Kyrmyzy-Kazakhlar, Yagarchi-Kazakhlar, and Yegarchikazakhlar) is a village and municipality in the Goranboy Rayon of Azerbaijan. It has a population of 694.
