= Məşədiqaralar =

Village and municipality in Goranboy Rayon, Azerbaijan

Coordinates: 40°37′N 46°52′E

Məşədiqaralar is a village and municipality in the Goranboy Rayon of Azerbaijan. It has a population of 595.
