= Yolqulular =

- Municipality
- Location within Azerbaijan
- Coordinates: 40°37′32″N 46°30′55″E
- Country: Azerbaijan
- Rayon: Goranboy

Population
  - Total: 709
- Time zone: UTC+4 (AZT)
  - Summer (DST): UTC+5 (AZT)

Yolqulular (also, Yëlkulular) is a village and municipality in the Goranboy Rayon of Azerbaijan. It has a population of 709.
