= Elvazlu =

- Village
- Location within Azerbaijan
- Coordinates: 40°37′31″N 46°54′29″E
- Country: Azerbaijan
- Rayon: Goranboy
- Time zone: UTC+4 (AZT)
  - Summer (DST): UTC+5 (AZT)

Elvazlu is a village in the Goranboy Rayon of Azerbaijan.
