= Hazırəhmədli =

Hazyrahmedli
- Azerbaijani: Hazırəhmədli
- Location within Azerbaijan
- Coordinates: 40°44′05″N 46°38′23″E
- Country: Azerbaijan
- District: Goranboy

Population
  - Total: 2,447
- Time zone: UTC+4 (AZT)
  - Summer (DST): UTC+5 (AZT)

Hazırəhmədli (also, Hazyrahmedli) is a village and municipality in the Goranboy District of Azerbaijan. It has a population of 2,347. The municipality consists of the villages of Hazyrahmedli, Beshirli, Garasuchu, and Göynüyən.
