= Shamkhalar =

- Village
- Location within Azerbaijan
- Coordinates: 40°45′17″N 46°42′45″E
- Country: Azerbaijan
- Rayon: Goranboy
- Time zone: UTC+4 (AZT)
  - Summer (DST): UTC+5 (AZT)

Shamkhalar is a village in the Goranboy Rayon of Azerbaijan.
