= Qarasuçu =

- Location within Azerbaijan
- Coordinates: 40°45′20″N 46°40′23″E
- Country: Azerbaijan
- Rayon: Goranboy
- Municipality: Hazırəhmədli
- Time zone: UTC+4 (AZT)
  - Summer (DST): UTC+5 (AZT)

Qarasuçu (also, Karasuchilar and Karasuchu) is a village in the Goranboy Rayon of Azerbaijan. The village forms part of the municipality of Hazırəhmədli.

== Notable natives ==
- Mammad Maharramov — Hero of the Soviet Union.
