= Asger agha Gorani =

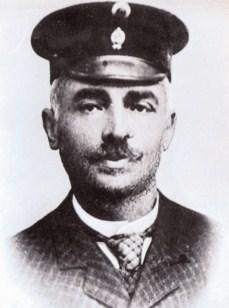
- Born: 15 April [O.S. 3 April] 1857; Goran-Boyahmedli, Russian Empire
- Died: 22 March [O.S. 9 March] 1910; Elizavetpol, Russian Empire
- Education: Petrovsky Agricultural Academy
- Occupations: Writer, actor, theater critic, translator and journalist

Asger agha Gorani or Asger bey Adigozalov (Azerbaijani: Əsgər ağa Gorani; b. 15 April [O.S. 3 April] 1857, Goran-Boyahmedli, Elizavetpol uezd, Tiflis Governorate – d. 22 March [O.S. 9 March] 1910, Elizavetpol) was an ethnic Azerbaijani writer, actor, theater critic, translator and journalist in the Russian Empire.

== Life ==
Asger agha Gorani was born on 15 April [O.S. 3 April] 1857 in the village of Goran-Boyahmedli. He was the grandson of the Azerbaijani historian, the author of the historical work "Karabakh-name" Mirza Adigozal bey. His family was originally from Shusha. He graduated from the Baku City Gymnasium with a gold medal. Then he entered the Petrovsky Agricultural Academy in Moscow. After graduating from the academy in 1878, he returned to his homeland.

He was a provincial secretary, collegiate assessor, property adviser. He worked as an assistant judge of the county judge of the Elizavetpol (Ganja) province, assistant prosecutor in the prosecutor's office of the Tiflis district court, head of the Elizavetpol (Ganja) municipality for five years, honorary warden of the Mikhailovskaya school in c (Ganja). In Elizavetpol, at his own expense, he opened a school for girls.

He died on 22 March [O.S. 9 March] 1910 in Elizavetpol, and was buried in the old city cemetery Sabiskar. Turbe was erected over his grave.

== Creativity ==
Asger agha Gorani was one of the first Azerbaijani theatrical actors. While still a schoolboy, she took part in amateur performances by M. F. Akhundov. In 1873, in the comedy "Adventures of the Lankaran Khanate Vizier" he played the role of Teymur aga, a little later he played the main role in the comedy "Haji Kara".

Asger agha was the author of theatrical and artistic works. In his comedy "Tricks in old age" (published in 1892 in Tiflis), feudal-patriarchal mores are criticized. Adygezalov's novel "The Black Wind" is dedicated to the campaign of Agha Mohammed Shah Qajar to the Caucasus. He also wrote the play "Qocalıqda yorğalıq" and the vaudeville "Hənək, hənək, axırı dəyənək". He translated some poetic works of Pushkin and Lermontov into Azerbaijani.

== See also ==
- Hasan bey Zardabi

== Sources ==
- Guliev, Jamil (1986). Azərbaycan Sovet Ensiklopediyası. Baku: ASE Redaksiyası.
- "Адигезалов Аскер-бек". Театральная энциклопедия. Vol. 1. Moscow: Советская энциклопедия. 1961.
- Мурадов, Закир (22 July 2017). "Ко Дню национальной прессы и 160-летию со дня рождения Аскера ага Герани". www.anl.az. Archived from the original on 26 June 2020.
