= Kelami =

- Village (no longer exists under this name)
- Location within Azerbaijan
- Coordinates: 40°28′51″N 46°35′58″E
- Country: Azerbaijan
- Rayon: Goranboy
- Time zone: UTC+4 (AZT)
  - Summer (DST): UTC+5 (AZT)

Kelami was a village in the Goranboy Rayon of Azerbaijan.
