= Yuxarı Ballıqaya =

Ballıqaya
- Location within Azerbaijan
- Coordinates: 40°34′06″N 46°52′39″E
- Country: Azerbaijan
- District: Goranboy
- Municipality: Qızılhacılı
- Time zone: UTC+4 (AZT)
  - Summer (DST): UTC+5 (AZT)

Yuxarı Ballıqaya is a village in the Yuxarı Ağcakənd settlement administrative-territorial district of Goranboy District of Azerbaijan. The village forms part of the municipality of Aşağı Ağcakənd. By the Law of Azerbaijan dated December 14, 2004, the village of Ballıqaya in the Yuxarı Ağcakənd settlement administrative-territorial district was renamed Yuxarı Ballıqaya.
