= Xınalı =

- Municipality
- Location within Azerbaijan
- Coordinates: 40°43′41″N 46°43′43″E
- Country: Azerbaijan
- Rayon: Goranboy

Population
  - Total: 865
- Time zone: UTC+4 (AZT)
  - Summer (DST): UTC+5 (AZT)

Xınalı (also, Xınallı and Khynaly) is a village and municipality in the Goranboy Rayon of Azerbaijan. It has a population of 865.
