= Qarqucaq =

- Municipality
- Location within Azerbaijan
- Coordinates: 40°29′36″N 46°43′13″E
- Country: Azerbaijan
- Rayon: Goranboy

Population
  - Total: 745
- Time zone: UTC+4 (AZT)
  - Summer (DST): UTC+5 (AZT)

Qarqucaq (also, Karkudzhan, Karkudzhak, Karakudzhakh, and Karakudzhak) is a village and municipality in the Goranboy Rayon of Azerbaijan. It has a population of 745.
