= Mammad Maharramov =

Azerbaijani Red Army lieutenant (1919–1977)

- Məhərrəmov Məmməd Əli oğlu
- Born: 9 October 1919; Qarasuçu, Azerbaijan Democratic Republic
- Died: 5 May 1977 (aged 57)
- Military career
- Allegiance: Soviet Union
- Branch: Red Army
- Service years: 1939–45
- Rank: Lieutenant
- Unit: 254th Rifle Division
- Conflicts: Winter War; World War II; Battle of Kursk; Battle of the Dnieper
- Awards: Hero of the Soviet Union

Mammad Ali oglu Maharramov (Azerbaijani: Məhərrəmov Məmməd Əli oğlu; 9 October 1919 – 5 May 1977) was an Azerbaijani Red Army lieutenant and a Hero of the Soviet Union. Maharramov fought in the Winter War after being drafted into the Red Army in 1941. He fought in World War II from 1941 and was awarded the title Hero of the Soviet Union on 22 February 1944 for leading his squad in reportedly killing 50 German soldiers during the Battle of the Dnieper, among other actions. After the war, Maharramov was chairman of the village council and a kolkhoz.

== Early life ==
Maharramov was born on 9 October 1919 in Qarasuçu to a peasant family. He graduated from sixth grade. He was drafted into the Red Army in 1939 and fought in the Winter War against the Finns.

== World War II ==
Following the German invasion of the Soviet Union, Maharramov fought in combat from 1941. He fought at Kaunas, Novgorod, Staraya Russa, and Kursk. He became a squad leader and a senior sergeant in the 933rd Rifle Regiment of the 254th Rifle Division. In 1943, he joined the Communist Party of the Soviet Union. Maharramov fought in the battle for Right-bank Ukraine. He fought in the Battle of the Dnieper. During fighting south of Zinkiv, Maharramov's squad reportedly killed about twenty German soldiers and captured a platoon. For his actions, Maharramov was awarded the Order of the Red Star on 12 October.

On 2 October Maharramov and his squad crossed the Dnieper on a reconnaissance mission at Khreshchatyk in Cherkasy Raion. They reportedly located the German firing positions. On 17 October, the squad reportedly destroyed outposts, attacked the village, where it blew up an ammunition depot, suppressed artillery and mortar fire of German positions, destroying a car and killing up to 50 German soldiers. The squad then reportedly repulsed multiple counterattacks. On 22 February, Maharramov was awarded the title Hero of the Soviet Union and the Order of Lenin for his actions.

== Postwar ==
Maharramov was demobilized in 1945 with the rank of lieutenant. He lived in Qarasuçu. He worked as the chairman of the Kyalak village council in Kazum-Ismailovsky District. Maharramov later became chairman of a kolkhoz. He died on 5 May 1977 and was buried in Ganja.
