= Fikret Hajiyev =

- Born: May 19, 1964; Qızılhacılı, Goranboy District, Azerbaijan
- Died: May 5, 1992 (aged 27); Goranboy District, Azerbaijan
- Military career
- Allegiance: Republic of Azerbaijan
- Nickname: Fikret Hajiyev
- Conflicts: First Nagorno-Karabakh War
- Awards: National Hero of Azerbaijan; 1992

Fikret Hajiyev (Azerbaijani: Fikrət Hacıyev) (May 19, 1964, Qızılhacılı, Goranboy District – May 5, 1992, Goranboy District, Azerbaijan) was the National Hero of Azerbaijan, and the warrior of the First Nagorno-Karabakh War.

== Biography ==
Fikret Hajiyev was born on May 19, 1964, in the village of Qızılhacılı in the Goranboy District. In 1978, he graduated from the eighth grade and got an electrical specialty at Ganja Technical School. He was born on May 19, 1964, in the village of Qızılhacılıin the Goranboy District. In 1978, he graduated from the eighth grade and got an electrical specialty at Ganja Technical School. In 1982 he was called up for military service by the Military Commissariat of the Goranboy region. He completed his education at Baku Cooperative Technical School.

== Military activities ==
At the end of 1991, he went to the frontline as a volunteer. He participated in the defense battalion of Shafaq, Zeyve, Karachinar and other settlements of Goranboy District. Fikret Hajiyev died in battles around Goranboy District on May 5, 1992.

== Memorial ==
He was posthumously awarded the title of "National Hero of Azerbaijan" by Presidential Decree No. 833 dated 7 June 1992. He was buried in the Qızılhacılı village cemetery. Balliqaya village secondary school is named after him.

== See also ==
- First Nagorno-Karabakh War

== Sources ==
- Vugar Asgarov. Azərbaycanın Milli Qəhrəmanları (Yenidən işlənmiş II nəşr). Bakı: "Dərələyəz-M", 2010, səh. 108.
