= Qarasüleymanlı =

- Location within Azerbaijan
- Coordinates: 40°36′N 46°47′E
- Country: Azerbaijan
- Rayon: Goranboy
- Municipality: Goranboy
- Time zone: UTC+4 (AZT)
  - Summer (DST): UTC+5 (AZT)

Qarasüleymanlı (also, Karasuleymanly) is a village in the Goranboy Rayon of Azerbaijan. The village forms part of the municipality of Goranboy.

== Notable natives ==
- Mammad Hasanov — National Hero of Azerbaijan.
