= Gərməşeyli =

Human settlement in Azerbaijan

Coordinates: 40°40′N 45°28′E

Gərməşeyli (also, Görməşeyli) is a village in the municipality of Düz Rəsullu in the Gadabay Rayon of Azerbaijan.
