= Maytablı =

- Location within Azerbaijan
- Coordinates: 41°19′47″N 48°55′57″E
- Country: Azerbaijan
- Rayon: Davachi
- Municipality: Rəhimli
- Time zone: UTC+4 (AZT)
  - Summer (DST): UTC+5 (AZT)

Maytablı (also, Mahtablı, Meytablı, Meytabli, and Meytably) is a village in the Davachi Rayon of Azerbaijan. The village forms part of the municipality of Rəhimli.
