= Təkyemişan =

Village in Azerbaijan

Coordinates: 40°40′N 45°28′E

Təkyemişan (also, Təkyemşan) is a village in the municipality of Düz Rəsullu in the Gadabay Rayon of Azerbaijan.
