= Geran, Iran =

Geran (Persian: گران or گرن) in Iran may refer to:

- Geran, Gilan (گران - Gerān)
- Geran, Hormozgan (گرن - Geran)
- Geran, Sistan and Baluchestan (گران - Gerān)
