= Mirza Adigozal bey =

Historian (c. 1780–1848)

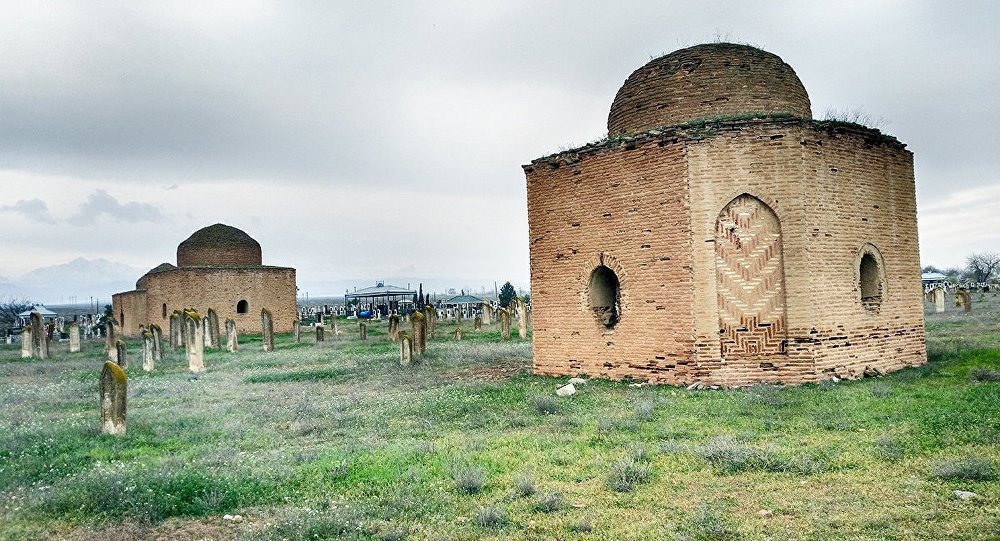
- Mausoleum of Mirza Adigozal bey
- Born: c. 1780; Shusha, Karabakh Khanate
- Died: September 9, 1848 (aged 67–68); Rahimli, Yelizavetpol Governorate
- Resting place: Mirza Adigozal bey family Mausoleums
- Known for: Author of Garabaghname
- Scientific career
- Fields: Historian

Mirza Adigozal bey (Azerbaijani: Mirzə Adıgözəl bəy; 1780s – September 9, 1848) was an Azerbaijani historian of the 19th century, best known as the author of Garabaghname. He received his early education at a maktab in Shusha. From the beginning of the 19th century, he served in the governmental and military-administrative service of Russia and held the rank of captain in the Imperial Russian Army.

== Early career ==
In 1795, with the approach of Mohammad Khan Qajar’s troops to Karabakh, Mirza Adigozal bey left Karabakh and resettled in Kartli-Kakheti (eastern Georgia) with his family and ilats (nomads) who depended on them, apparently living in the Iyirmidordskiy (Twenty-Fourth) mahal near the Aras River.

After the annexation of Kartli-Kakheti by Russia in 1801, Minister Kovalenskiy accepted Mirza Adigozal bey into service for conducting secret correspondence in Tiflis. Adigozal bey served Kovalenskiy in a confidential capacity and received a salary for his service. He likely held this position from late 1799 through 1800. From that time, Mirza Adigozal bey linked his career to the Russian administration and Russian troops in the South Caucasus for many years.

During the Russo-Turkish War of 1806–1812, he held the position of translator-clerk under Major-General D. Lisanevich. In his autobiography, he wrote:

Till the eleventh year I was a secretary at him. In that year I was given the rank of second-lieutenant. At last, in the sixteenth year, I was sent to Major-General Mehdigulu Khan – the former ruler of Karabakh – by the authority of Governor-General A.P. Yermolov.

In 1816, Mirza Adigozal bey was sent to Mehdigulu Khan by A.P. Yermolov as a Russian resident in Karabakh. This occurred before Yermolov's departure to Tehran as ambassador. Mehdigulu Khan of the Karabakh Khanate granted bey family lands, as well as populated areas, and appointed him naib of Iyirmidordskiy mahal. By order of General Yermolov, he served in the protection of Karabakh's boundaries for three years, from 1823 to 1826. Knyaz Madatov listed Mirza Adigozal bey's post in a schedule of border posts, stating:

On the lower slopes of Mount Murov, near Bazirgan Spring, at a distance of 15 versts… he was a second-lieutenant and naib of the mahal, stationed near the devastated village of Zod as civil guard… There were 40 people under Mirza Adigozal bey’s command, while Sotnik Nasledyshev had only 15 Cossacks under his command… According to this schedule, there were two lines of posts: a legal flank led by Staff Captain Chernoglazov from the devastated village of Zod to the Warm Waters, and the population’s guard led by Second-Lieutenant Mirza Adigozal bey.

== Participation in the Russo-Persian War of 1826–1828 ==
The Russo-Persian War (1826–1828) began after Russian forces occupied parts of Iran's Erivan Khanate in violation of the Treaty of Gulistan. The Iranians responded by sending troops into Shuragel, Pambak, and also into the Talysh and Karabakh. Frontier posts, which were insufficiently manned, conducted fighting retreats far inland. Mirza Adigozal bey and his detachments were cut off from communications with Shusha and Tiflis as a result of the Iranian incursion near Bazirgan Spring, located close to the border.

The situation was complicated by certain segments of the local population who, previously loyal to the khan's administration, defected and persuaded some nomads to support the invading forces. After the liquidation of the khanate administration, a small number of yuzbashis, maafs, ketkhudas, and some beys, having lost their privileged positions and sources of income, sought to restore the old order. They expected Iranian forces to re-establish the previous government structure and restore their lost privileges, knowing that Mehdigulu Khan of Karabakh was accompanying the forces of Abbas Mirza—the Iranian crown prince.

As a result, Mirza Adigozal bey decided to align with the crown prince and was sent to Tabriz as a captive.

Following the defeat of Iranian forces near Shamkir and in the general battle at Ganja, Abbas Mirza began preparations for peace talks. At the start of 1827, the prince released Mirza Adigozal bey and sent him back to Shusha. In that year, Mirza Adigozal bey crossed into enemy territory under the command of Prince Ivan Abkhazov and persuaded Mehdigulu Khan to defect to Russia. In recognition of his role in convincing Mehdigulu Khan to side with Russia, General Paskevich awarded Mirza Adigozal bey, stating in a report:

It is an honor for me to present the award to those who efficiently and courageously accomplished the assignment in enemy territory: Second-Lieutenant of Karabakh, Mirza Adigozal bey, and Knyaz Ivan Melikov, who was with Colonel Knyaz Abkhazov. They are promoted to the rank of Second-Lieutenant, and the first is to receive a salary… The first for remaining loyal to us despite the disturbance caused by his fellow believers while in Tiflis, and for enduring captivity and tortures in Tabriz.

It appears that Mirza Adigozal bey did not play an active role in the later stages of the war.

== Later years ==
In late 1829 and early 1830, Mirza Adigozal bey retired after serving for over 30 years. During the 1830s, he worked at the provincial court of Karabakh, which allowed him to gain a detailed understanding of the historical conditions, economic activities, and traditions of various parts of the province.

Out of deep respect for eminent personalities of the past, Mirza Adigozal bey commissioned the construction of a new mausoleum on the grave of the great Nizami, replacing the old, dilapidated structure. He wrote his notable work, Garabaghname, in his advanced years, around the age of 65.

Mirza Adigozal bey died on September 9, 1848, and was buried in the cemetery of Rahimli village, near Goranboy. A mausoleum was later erected over his grave. The date of his death is recorded on his gravestone. Asger agha Gorani was his grandson.
