= Qazanbulaq =

- Municipality
- Location within Azerbaijan
- Coordinates: 40°37′07″N 46°38′43″E
- Country: Azerbaijan
- District: Goranboy

Population
  - Total: 623
- Time zone: UTC+4 (AZT)
  - Summer (DST): UTC+5 (AZT)

Qazanbulaq (Gazanbulag) is a village and municipality in the Goranboy District of Azerbaijan. It has a population of 623.
