= Göyəmli =

Coordinates: 40°40′N 45°25′E

Göyəmli is a village in the municipality of Düz Rəsullu in the Gadabay Rayon of Azerbaijan.
