= İrəvanlı, Goranboy =

Coordinates: 40°37′58″N 46°49′12″E

Irevanly (Azerbaijani: İrəvanlı) is a village in the municipality of Goranboy in the Goranboy District of Azerbaijan.
