= Qızılhacılı, Goranboy =

Qızılhacılı
- Municipality
- Location within Azerbaijan
- Coordinates: 40°34′51″N 46°51′01″E
- Country: Azerbaijan
- Rayon: Goranboy

Population
  - Total: 8,830
- Time zone: UTC+4 (AZT)
  - Summer (DST): UTC+5 (AZT)

Qızılhacılı (also, Kyzylgadzhily and Kyzylgadzhyly) is a settlement and municipality in the Goranboy Rayon of Azerbaijan.

Qızılhacılı is the most populous locality among the cities and settlements of the Goranboy Rayon, excluding the city of Goranboy. The settlement has a population of 7,408. The municipality consists of the settlement of Qızılhacılı, and the villages of Aşağı Ballıqaya and Balakürd.

== Notable natives ==
- Fikret Hajiyev — National Hero of Azerbaijan.
- Yunis Aliyev — National Hero of Azerbaijan.
