= Balakürd =

- Location within Azerbaijan
- Coordinates: 40°35′24″N 46°50′11″E
- Country: Azerbaijan
- Rayon: Goranboy
- Municipality: Qızılhacılı
- Time zone: UTC+4 (AZT)
  - Summer (DST): UTC+5 (AZT)

Balakürd (also, Balakyurd) is a village in the Goranboy Rayon of Azerbaijan. The village forms part of the municipality of Qızılhacılı.
