= Düz Rəsullu =

- Municipality
- Location within Azerbaijan
- Coordinates: 40°39′33″N 45°28′09″E
- Country: Azerbaijan
- Rayon: Gadabay

Population
  - Total: 1,237
- Time zone: UTC+4 (AZT)
  - Summer (DST): UTC+5 (AZT)

Düz Rəsullu (also, Düzrəsullu and Dyuzrasullu) is a village and municipality in the Gadabay Rayon of Azerbaijan. It has a population of 1,237. The municipality consists of the villages of Düz Rəsullu, Gərməşeyli, Göyəmli, Rəhimli, Hüseynqulular, and Təkyemişan.
