= Qarağatlı =

Coordinates: 40°41′31.6″N 45°30′32.4″E

Qarağatlı is a village in the municipality of Göyəbaxan in the Tovuz Rayon of Azerbaijan.
