= Orta Qərvənd =

- Location within Azerbaijan Location within Karabakh Economic Region
- Coordinates: 40°10′17″N 47°04′05″E
- Country: Azerbaijan
- Rayon: Agdam
- Municipality: Qərvənd
- Time zone: UTC+4 (AZT)
  - Summer (DST): UTC+5 (AZT)

Orta Qərvənd (also, Orta-Karvend) is a village in the Agdam Rayon of Azerbaijan. The village forms part of the municipality of Qərvənd. A 9 year old resident of Orta Qərvənd was shot by the Armenian sniper on March 8, 2011. The Armenian armed forces shot him from the direction of Şıxlar village while he was playing in the yard.
