= Göyəbaxan =

- Municipality
- Location within Azerbaijan
- Coordinates: 40°40′58″N 45°30′02″E
- Country: Azerbaijan
- Rayon: Tovuz

Population
  - Total: 414
- Time zone: UTC+4 (AZT)
  - Summer (DST): UTC+5 (AZT)

Göyəbaxan (also, Gëyabakhan and Gyazabakhan) is a village and municipality in the Tovuz Rayon of Azerbaijan. It has a population of 414. The municipality consists of the villages of Göyəbaxan, Qarağatlı, Məşədiqulular, Nəsibli, and Hüseynqulular.
