= Mirza Adigozal bey family Mausoleums =

Mausoleum in Rahimli, Azerbaijan

- Mirzə Adıgözəl bəy ailəsinin türbələri (Azerbaijani)
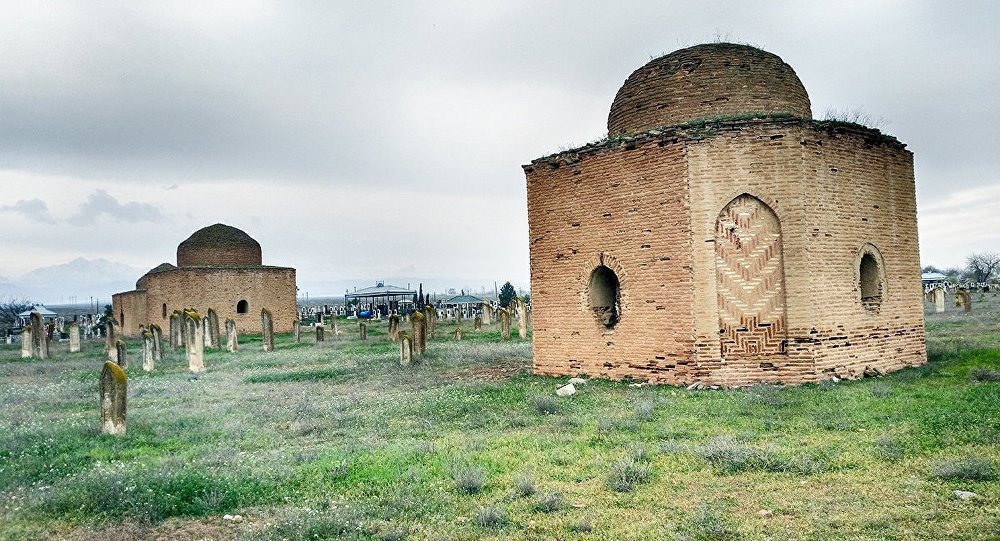
- Interactive map of Mirza Adigozal bey family Mausoleums
- Type: Mausoleum
- Location: Rahimli
- Nearest city: Goranboy District

History
- Founded: XIX century
- Built for: Mirza Adigozal bey

Site notes
- Architectural style: Islamic
- Governing body: Ministry of Culture

Mirza Adigozal bey family Mausoleums (Azerbaijani: Mirzə Adıgözəl bəy ailəsinin türbələri) are architectural monuments dedicated to Mirza Adigozal bey, Azerbaijani historian. The historical monument is an Islamic mausoleum in the Azerbaijani village of Rahimli, Goranboy District. The site is also the final resting place of his family members.

== History ==
The buildings in the complex surround a small graveyard in the Rahimli village. They were constructed in the 19th century. The mausoleum complex is now owned by the Ministry of Culture.

The present complex includes 6 separate surviving mausoleums (türbe) with domes. 4 big mausoleums were built of burnt brick, while cobblestones and pebbles were used for the remain small ones. All of them are relatively small buildings, domed and quadrilateral in shape, containing a single chamber.

Around the western edge of the tomb, there is an inscription carved by Mirza Mehdi Ganjavi, calligrapher. Over the façade, placing on the gypsum panel, this inscription attributes the main tomb to Mirza Adigozal bey, and other tombs to his close relatives. The mausoleum of Mirza Adigozal bey bears the date of 1847/1848 as the year of his death.

== Architecture ==
The big four mausoleums, made of square burnt bricks, were built in the same line, at a distance of about 10 meters from each other. The two tombs in the middle are better studied technically.

The exterior of Mirza Adigozal bey's mausoleum is a brick masonry. It features a quadrilateral base and domed sepulchre. The mausoleum has a cross with shallow arms inside. This form is based on one of the most common early forms of domed mausoleums.

The edifice has dimensions of 5.8x5.8 m inside. Thickness of the facade walls is 82 cm. The mausoleum is covered by a spherical dome with a projecting roof over the main part of the tomb. Dome was constructed of bricks which had dimensions of 20x21x4 cm. The main entrance faces towards the south. Additionally, the tomb also has three side doors.

The second mausoleum, located near the Mirza Adigozal bey's mausoleum, has a square shape with corners cut from the outside. The walls of the monument were shaped with niches. The niches were completed in an arrow-shape. The surface of the niches was made of brick with a pine-weave. The internal dimensions of the second tomb corresponds to the architecture of Mirza Adigozal bey's mausoleum. Its interior arches had been decorated with floral patterns. Ornaments were firstly outlined on a lime plaster and painted in bright colours afterwards.

== Literature ==
- Саламзаде, А. В. (1964). Архитектура Азербайдана XVI-XIX вв. Баку: Издательство Академии наук Азербайджанской ССР.
- Н.В.Минкевич-Мустафайева, С.К. Ахмедов (1948). Мавзолеи семейства Мирза Адигезал-бека. АН Азерб. ССР, т.IV, вып. 12. p. 220.
