= Aşağı Ballıqaya =

- Location within Azerbaijan
- Coordinates: 40°22′17″N 46°28′18″E
- Country: Azerbaijan
- Rayon: Goranboy
- Time zone: UTC+4 (AZT)
  - Summer (DST): UTC+5 (AZT)

Aşağı Ballıqaya is a village in the Qızılhacılı settlement administrative-territorial district of Goranboy Rayon of Azerbaijan. The village forms part of the municipality of Qızılhacılı. By the Law of Azerbaijan dated December 14, 2004, the village of Ballıqaya in the Qızılhacılı settlement administrative-territorial district was renamed Aşağı Ballıqaya.
