= Kolqışlaq =

- Location within Azerbaijan Location within Karabakh Economic Region
- Coordinates: 40°07′N 47°03′E
- Country: Azerbaijan
- Rayon: Agdam
- Municipality: Qərvənd
- Time zone: UTC+4 (AZT)
  - Summer (DST): UTC+5 (AZT)

Kolqışlaq (also, Kolkyshlak and Kolkyshlakh) is a village in the Agdam Rayon of Azerbaijan. The village forms part of the municipality of Qərvənd.
