= Sabiskar cemetery =

- Səbiskar qəbiristanlığı
- Interactive map of Sabiskar cemetery

Details
- Location: Ganja, Azerbaijan
- Country: Azerbaijan

Sabiskar cemetery is a historical cemetery located in the city of Ganja, Azerbaijan. The cemetery contains 18 historical mausoleums. In addition, many prominent Azerbaijani figures are buried here. The Asgar Agha Gorani Mausoleum, located within the cemetery, is recognized as a local architectural monument.

== About ==
The cemetery is believed to date back either to the 16th or 19th century, according to various hypotheses. It covers an area of 7 hectares. Many notable Azerbaijanis are buried here. Additionally, the cemetery features various sculptures and 18 mausoleums built from red bricks, with either four or eight arches. The Asgar Agha Gorani Mausoleum, located within the cemetery, was included in the list of immovable historical and cultural monuments of local significance by the decision No. 132 of the Cabinet of Ministers of the Republic of Azerbaijan on August 2, 2001.

The mausoleums were built in memory of Asgar Agha Adigozalzadeh, Haji Mir Qasim Hamzayev, Iskandar Khan Khoyski, Batman Qilinch Dunbully, Mirmutalib Qubali oghlu, Haji Samed Khalilzadeh, Haji Vagif Valiyev, and others. In addition to the mausoleums, there are also family crypts, designed according to the traditions of the Ganja population, meant for entire families.

Between 2009 and 2011, the "Difai Heroes" memorial complex was constructed within the cemetery. This complex features the busts of prominent figures such as Javad Khan, Shah Ismail Khatai, Sattar Khan, Sheikh Mohammad Khiabani, Seyid Jafar Pishavari, Mahammad Amin Rasulzadeh, Alimardan bey Topchubashov, Nasib bey Yusifbeyli, Fatali Khan Khoyski, Hasan bey Agayev, Khudadat bey Rafibeyli, Jangir bey Kazimbeyli, Sari Alekber, and Abidli Aliqara Mammadli.

== Buried in the cemetery ==
- Abdulla Sur — literary scholar, critic.
- Asim Qaziyev — poet, head of the Literary Writers' Union.
- Asgar Agha Gorani — writer, educator, theater figure, and public figure.
- Ashraf Yusifzadeh — People's Artist of the Azerbaijan SSR, theater actor.
- Ismayil Talibli — People's Artist of the Azerbaijan SSR, actor.
- Qurban Abbasov — Honored Artist of the Azerbaijan SSR, theater actor.
- Mammadtagi Jafarov — Full Member of the Azerbaijan National Academy of Sciences, Doctor of Agricultural Sciences, professor.
- Reyhan Taghiyeva — Honored Artist of the Georgian SSR, actress at the Ganja Drama Theater.
- Mirza Mahammad Akhundzadeh — poet, publicist, translator, folklorist, philologist, dramatist.
- Kifayat Ganjali — Honored Artist of the Republic of Azerbaijan, singer.
- Karim Sultanov — Honored Artist of the Azerbaijan SSR, actor.

== See also ==
- Alley of Honor
- Martyrs' Lane
