= Poghos Bek-Pirumyan =

Armenian military commander

Poghos Bek-Pirumyan Պօղոս Բէկ Փիրումեան
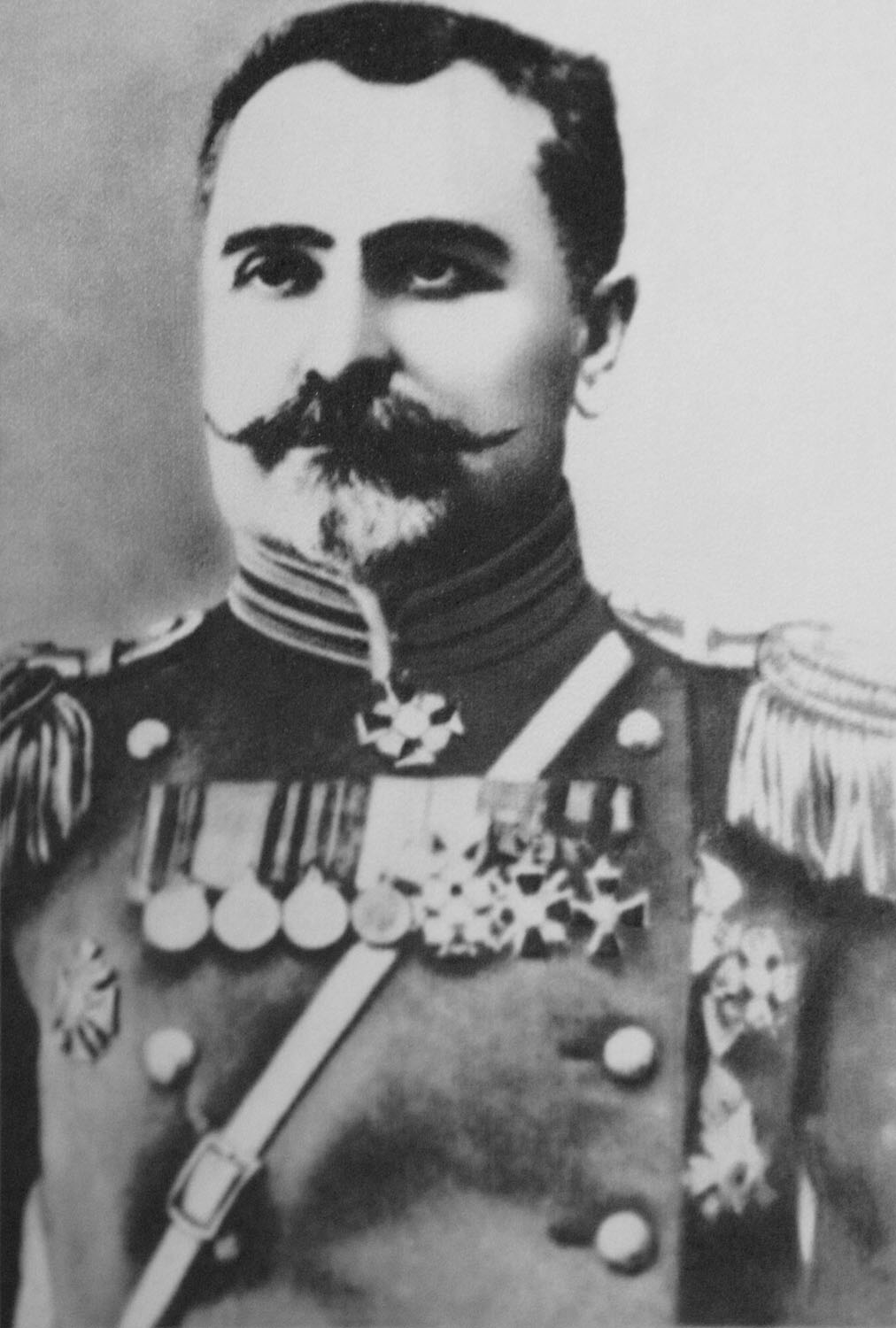
- Born: 8 June 1856; Nakhichevanik, Shusha uezd, Elizavetpol Governorate, Russian Empire
- Died: 19 January 1921 (aged 64); Karakilisa, Armenian SSR (now Vanadzor, Armenia)
- Relatives: Daniel Bek-Pirumian (cousin)
- Military career
- Allegiance: Russian Empire (1881–1917); Republic of Armenia (1918–1920)
- Branch: Army
- Service years: 1878–1920
- Rank: Colonel
- Commands: 5th Armenian Regiment
- Conflicts: Russo-Turkish War; Russo-Japanese War; World War I; Western Front; Caucasus Campaign; Battle of Sardarabad; Armenian National Liberation Movement
- Awards: see below

Poghos Bek-Pirumyan (Armenian: Պօղոս Բէկ Փիրումեան; 8 June 1856 – 19 January 1921) was an Armenian military commander. He served as a colonel for the Russian Empire in World War I and was a commander of the Battle of Sardarabad.

== Biography ==
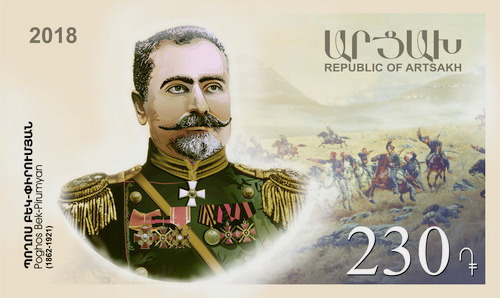
Bek-Pirumyan on a 2018 stamp of Artsakh

Poghos Bek-Pirumyan was born on 8 June 1856 in Nakhichevanik village of the Shusha uezd of the Elizavetpol Governorate within the Russian Empire. He is the cousin of Daniel Bek-Pirumian. Poghos graduated from the high school in Shusha, then attended cadet school, and joined the Imperial Russian Army in 1878. He held several positions of battalion and regiment commander, and participated in both the Russo-Turkish War of 1877–78 and the Russo-Japanese War of 1904–05. In 1914, Bek-Pirumyan retired, but came out of retirement that same year with the outbreak of World War I. Bek-Pirumyan fought on the Western Front, and then in the Caucasus Campaign. Since 1916, he was the commander of the 5th Armenian Rifle Regiment, which participated in the battles of Van and Mush.

At the Battle of Sardarabad in 1918, the 5th Regiment was a reserve guerrilla unit and a special cavalry regiment. His cousin, Daniel Bek-Pirumyan, also participated in the battle as a commander-in-chief. Armenian general Movses Silikyan ordered elements of the 5th Armenian Regiment under Bek-Pirumyan to check the advance of the Ottoman army. An offensive was launched on May 22 and the Armenian forces were successful in halting the Ottomans in their tracks and forcing Yakub Shevki Pasha's forces into a general rout, retreating nearly 15-20 kilometers in a westerly direction. The Ottoman command, however, was able to recuperate from its losses and reorganized its forces near the mountain heights on the north-west bank of the Araks river. Repeated attempts to cross the river were met with fierce resistance by the 5th Armenian Regiment. On May 24, several more skirmishes took place between the Armenian and Ottoman forces. The battle came to end on May 29, with a decisive Armenian victory

After Sovietization of Armenia in December 1920, about 1,000 officers of the First Republic of Armenia were arrested by the Bolshevik authorities, and were forced to walk from Yerevan to Alaverdi by foot (about 160 kilometers). Some of them were killed on the road. In January 1921, many heroes of the Battle of Sardarabad were shot, including Daniel Bek-Pirumyan. Poghos Bek-Pirumyan committed suicide on 19 January 1921 after being tortured. These events soon led to the February Uprising.

== Personal life ==
Bek-Pirumyan married his wife Catherine in 1892, and they had three children: Alexander (b. 1893), Tamara (b. 1897), and Michael (b. 1899).

His cousin, Daniel Bek-Pirumian, was also a colonel who fought in many of the same battles as Poghos, including the Battle of Sardarabad.

== Awards ==
- (Russian Empire) Order of Saint Stanislaus, 3rd class (1881)
- (Russian Empire) Order of St. Anna, 4th class (1882)
- (Russian Empire) Order of St. Anna, 3rd class (1882)
- (Russian Empire) Order of Saint Stanislaus, 2nd class (1901)
- (Russian Empire) Order of St. Vladimir, 4th class (1904)
- (Russian Empire) Order of St. George, 3rd class (1908)
- (Russian Empire) Order of St. Anna, 2nd class (1909)
- (Russian Empire) Order of St. Vladimir, 3rd class (1916)
- (Russian Empire) Gold Sword for Bravery
- (Russian Empire) Medal "For the capture of Geok-Tepe" (1881)
- (Iran) Order of the Lion and the Sun, 3rd class
