= Rəhimli, Davachi =

Rəhimli
- Municipality
- Location within Azerbaijan
- Coordinates: 41°19′07″N 48°55′05″E
- Country: Azerbaijan
- Rayon: Davachi

Population
  - Total: 1,363
- Time zone: UTC+4 (AZT)
  - Summer (DST): UTC+5 (AZT)

Rəhimli (also, Ragimli) is a village and municipality in the Davachi Rayon of Azerbaijan. It has a population of 1,363. The municipality consists of the villages of Rəhimli and Maytablı.
