= Çıraqlı, Agdam =

Çıraqlı
- Municipality
- Location within Azerbaijan Location within Karabakh Economic Region
- Coordinates: 40°07′29.1″N 47°01′34″E
- Country: Azerbaijan
- Rayon: Agdam

Population
  - Total: 2,207
- Time zone: UTC+4 (AZT)
  - Summer (DST): UTC+5 (AZT)

Çıraqlı (Chiragly) is a village in the municipality of Qərvənd in the Agdam District of Azerbaijan, which was ruined during the First Nagorno-Karabakh War. The village was located on the Nagorno-Karabakh Line of Contact until the 2020 Nagorno-Karabakh war, during which it was frequently hit by missiles by the Armenian Army.
