= Kichan =

Kichan / Ballygaya Կիչան / Ballıqaya
- Location within Azerbaijan
- Coordinates: 40°03′45″N 46°40′24″E
- Country: Azerbaijan
  - District: Aghdara
- Elevation: 935 m (3,068 ft)

Population (2015)
  - Total: 178
- Time zone: UTC+4 (AZT)

Kichan (Armenian: Կիչան; Azerbaijani: Ballıqaya) is a village located in the Aghdara District of Azerbaijan. The village had an ethnic Armenian-majority population until the expulsion of the Armenian population of Nagorno-Karabakh by Azerbaijan following the 2023 Azerbaijani offensive in Nagorno-Karabakh.

== History ==
During the Soviet period, the village was a part of the Mardakert District of the Nagorno-Karabakh Autonomous Oblast.

== Historical heritage sites ==
Historical heritage sites in and around the village include the monastery of Anapat (Armenian: Անապատ) and a cemetery from between the 12th and 18th centuries, a 13th-century khachkar, an 18th-century chapel, and the 19th-century church of Surb Astvatsatsin (Armenian: Սուրբ Աստվածածին, lit. 'Holy Mother of God').

== Economy and culture ==
The population is mainly engaged in agriculture and animal husbandry. As of 2015, the village has a municipal building, a secondary school, two shops and a medical centre.

== Demographics ==
The village had 168 inhabitants in 2005, and 178 inhabitants in 2015.
