= Hüseynqulular, Tovuz =

Hüseynqulular
- Location within Azerbaijan
- Coordinates: 40°40′N 45°31′E
- Country: Azerbaijan
- Rayon: Tovuz
- Municipality: Göyəbaxan
- Time zone: UTC+4 (AZT)
  - Summer (DST): UTC+5 (AZT)

Hüseynqulular (also, Guseynkullar) is a village in the Tovuz Rayon of Azerbaijan. The village forms part of the municipality of Göyəbaxan.
