= Ballıqaya, Qubadli =

Ballıqaya
- Location within Azerbaijan
- Coordinates: 39°14′49″N 46°39′24″E
- Country: Azerbaijan
- Rayon: Qubadli
- Time zone: UTC+4 (AZT)
  - Summer (DST): UTC+5 (AZT)

Ballıqaya (also, Ballykaya) is a village in the Qubadli Rayon of Azerbaijan. Ballıqaya is the Azerbaijani village in Qubadli
