= Kozun (surname) =

Kozun is a surname. Notable people with this surname include:

- Brandon Kozun (born 1990), Canadian ice hockey player
- Karol Kozuń (born 1982), Polish Paralympic athlete
- Taran Kozun (born 1994), Canadian ice hockey player
