= Çıraqlı, Dashkasan =

Çıraqlı
- Municipality
- Location within Azerbaijan
- Coordinates: 40°25′19″N 46°13′29″E
- Country: Azerbaijan
- Rayon: Dashkasan

Population
  - Total: 173
- Time zone: UTC+4 (AZT)
  - Summer (DST): UTC+5 (AZT)

Çıraqlı (also, Chirakhly, Chyragly, and Chyrakhly) is a village and municipality in the Dashkasan Rayon of Azerbaijan. It has a population of 173.
