= Sarnaghbyur, Nagorno-Karabakh =

Sarnaghbyur / Aghbulag Սառնաղբյուր / Ağbulaq
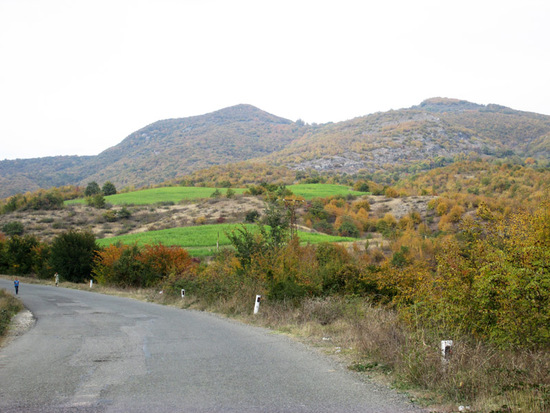
- Scenery around the village

- Location within Azerbaijan Location within Karabakh Economic Region
- Coordinates: 39°52′33″N 46°53′49″E
- Country: Azerbaijan
  - District: Khojaly

Population (2015)
  - Total: 107
- Time zone: UTC+4 (AZT)

Sarnaghbyur (Armenian: Սառնաղբյուր) or Aghbulag (Azerbaijani: Ağbulaq) is a village in the Khojaly District of Azerbaijan, in the region of Nagorno-Karabakh. Until 2023 it was controlled by the breakaway Republic of Artsakh. The village had an ethnic Armenian-majority population until the expulsion of the Armenian population of Nagorno-Karabakh by Azerbaijan following the 2023 Azerbaijani offensive in Nagorno-Karabakh.

== History ==
During the Soviet period, the village was part of the Askeran District of the Nagorno-Karabakh Autonomous Oblast.

== Historical heritage sites ==
Historical heritage sites in and around the village include an 18th/19th-century cemetery, the cave-shrine of Htsut (Armenian: Հցուտ), and St. George's Church (Armenian: Սուրբ Գևորգ եկեղեցի, romanized: Surb Gevorg Yekeghetsi) built in 1875.

== Economy and culture ==
The population is mainly engaged in agriculture and animal husbandry. As of 2015, the village has a municipal building, a secondary school, and a medical centre. The community of Sarnaghbyur includes the village of Dahraz.

== Demographics ==
The village had 97 inhabitants in 2005, and 107 inhabitants in 2015.

== Gallery ==
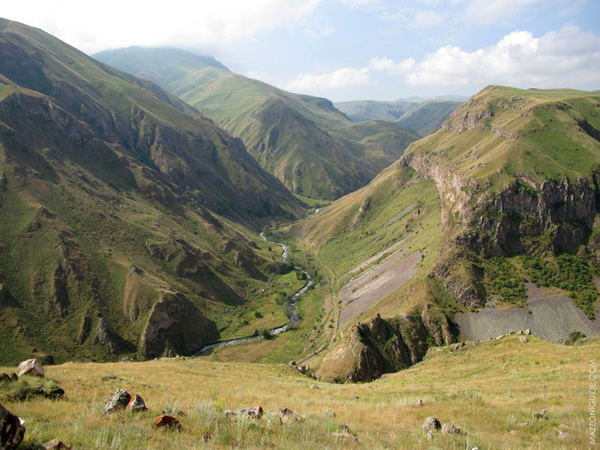
Scenery around the village
