= Rəhimli, Gadabay =

Village in Azerbaijan

Rəhimli
- Village
- Location of Rəhimli in Azerbaijan
- Coordinates: 40°39′33″N 45°28′9″E
- Country: Azerbaijan
- Rayon: Gadabay Rayon
- Municipality: Düz Rəsullu

Rəhimli is a village in the municipality of Düz Rəsullu in the Gadabay Rayon of Azerbaijan.
