= Rəhimli, Goranboy =

Village in Goranboy, Azerbaijan

Rahimli
- Municipality
- Rahimli Village
- Location within Azerbaijan
- Coordinates: 40°35′13″N 46°44′49″E
- Country: Azerbaijan
- Rayon: Goranboy
- Established: 18th century

Population
  - Total: 1,000+
- Time zone: UTC+4 (AZT)
  - Summer (DST): UTC+5 (AZT)
- Area code: 22 (car)

Rahimli (also in azerbaijani language : , "Rəhimli" and "Rəhimli kəndi") is ancient Turkish village and municipality in the Goranboy District of Azerbaijan. It has a population of 1,109 (2009).

== History ==
Rahimli village is one of the oldest settlements in Azerbaijan. At present, the village still has various monuments from the 18th century.

== Historical monuments ==
Mirza Adigozal bey family Mausoleums (Azerbaijani: Mirzə Adıgözəl bəy ailəsinin türbələri) are historical and architectural monuments located in Rahimli village of Goranboy District, Azerbaijan

A total of six mausoleums have reached our time in the Rahimli village cemetery. Four large mausoleums were built of baked bricks and two small mausoleums were made of river stone. On the façade of the tombs, from the inscriptions on gypsum board mounted on the western wall, it is known that in one of them the Azerbaijani historian Mirza Adigozal bey was buried, and in the others his family members were buried. The date of the Mirza adigozal bey's death is indicated on the tomb as 1847/1848, and the name of the calligrapher who wrote the inscription is written as Mirza Mehdi Ganjavi.
