= Geravand, Kermanshah =

Geravand گراوند
- Village
- Location within Iran
- Coordinates: 34°26′50″N 46°57′31″E
- Country: Iran
- Province: Kermanshah
- County: Kermanshah
- Bakhsh: Central
- Rural District: Baladarband

Population (2006)
  - Total: 364
- Time zone: UTC+3:30 (IRST)
  - Summer (DST): UTC+4:30 (IRDT)

Geravand (Persian: گراوند, also Romanized as Gerāvand, Garāvand, and Garāwand; also known as Gerāvand-e Khāleşeh) is a village in Baladarband Rural District, in the Central District of Kermanshah County, Kermanshah Province, Iran. At the 2006 census, its population was 364, in 94 families.
