= Hüseynqulular, Gadabay =

Coordinates: 40.6585422°N 45.4663078°E

Hüseynqulular is a village in the municipality of Düz Rəsullu in the Gadabay Rayon of Azerbaijan.
