= Çıraqlı, Shamakhi =

Çıraqlı
- Municipality
- Location within Azerbaijan
- Coordinates: 40°33′05″N 48°43′17″E
- Country: Azerbaijan
- Rayon: Shamakhi

Population
  - Total: 242
- Time zone: UTC+4 (AZT)
  - Summer (DST): UTC+5 (AZT)

Çıraqlı (also, Chiragly, Chirakhly, and Chyragly) is a village and municipality in the Shamakhi Rayon of Azerbaijan. It has a population of 242.
