= Çıraqlı, Lachin =

Village in Azerbaijan

Çıraqlı
- Location within Azerbaijan Location within East Zangezur Economic Region
- Coordinates: 39°43′50″N 46°18′58″E
- Country: Azerbaijan
- District: Lachin
- Elevation: 1,994 m (6,542 ft)
- Time zone: UTC+4 (AZT)

Çıraqlı (Chiragly) is a village in the Lachin District of Azerbaijan. The village came under occupation of Armenian forces on 17 May 1992 during the First Nagorno-Karabakh war. It was returned to Azerbaijan in 2020 as part of the 2020 Nagorno-Karabakh ceasefire agreement.
