= Sabzi, Bagh-e Malek =

Sabzi سبزي
- Village
- Location within Iran
- Coordinates: 31°35′22″N 49°47′18″E
- Country: Iran
- Province: Khuzestan
- County: Bagh-e Malek
- Bakhsh: Central
- Rural District: Rud Zard

Population (2006)
  - Total: 37
- Time zone: UTC+3:30 (IRST)
  - Summer (DST): UTC+4:30 (IRDT)

Sabzi (Persian: سبزي, also Romanized as Sabzī; also known as Garāvand-e Sabzī) is a village in Rud Zard Rural District, in the Central District of Bagh-e Malek County, Khuzestan Province, Iran. At the 2006 census, its population was 37, in 9 families.
