= İrəvanlı, Yevlakh =

Irevanly
- Municipality
- Azerbaijani: İrəvanlı
- Location within Azerbaijan
- Coordinates: 40°45′35″N 47°16′20″E
- Country: Azerbaijan
- District: Yevlakh

Population
  - Total: 227
- Time zone: UTC+4 (AZT)
  - Summer (DST): UTC+5 (AZT)

Irevanly is a village and the least populous municipality in the Yevlakh District of Azerbaijan.
