= Daniel Bek-Pirumian =

Armenian military commander (1861–1922)

Daniel-Bek Pirumyan
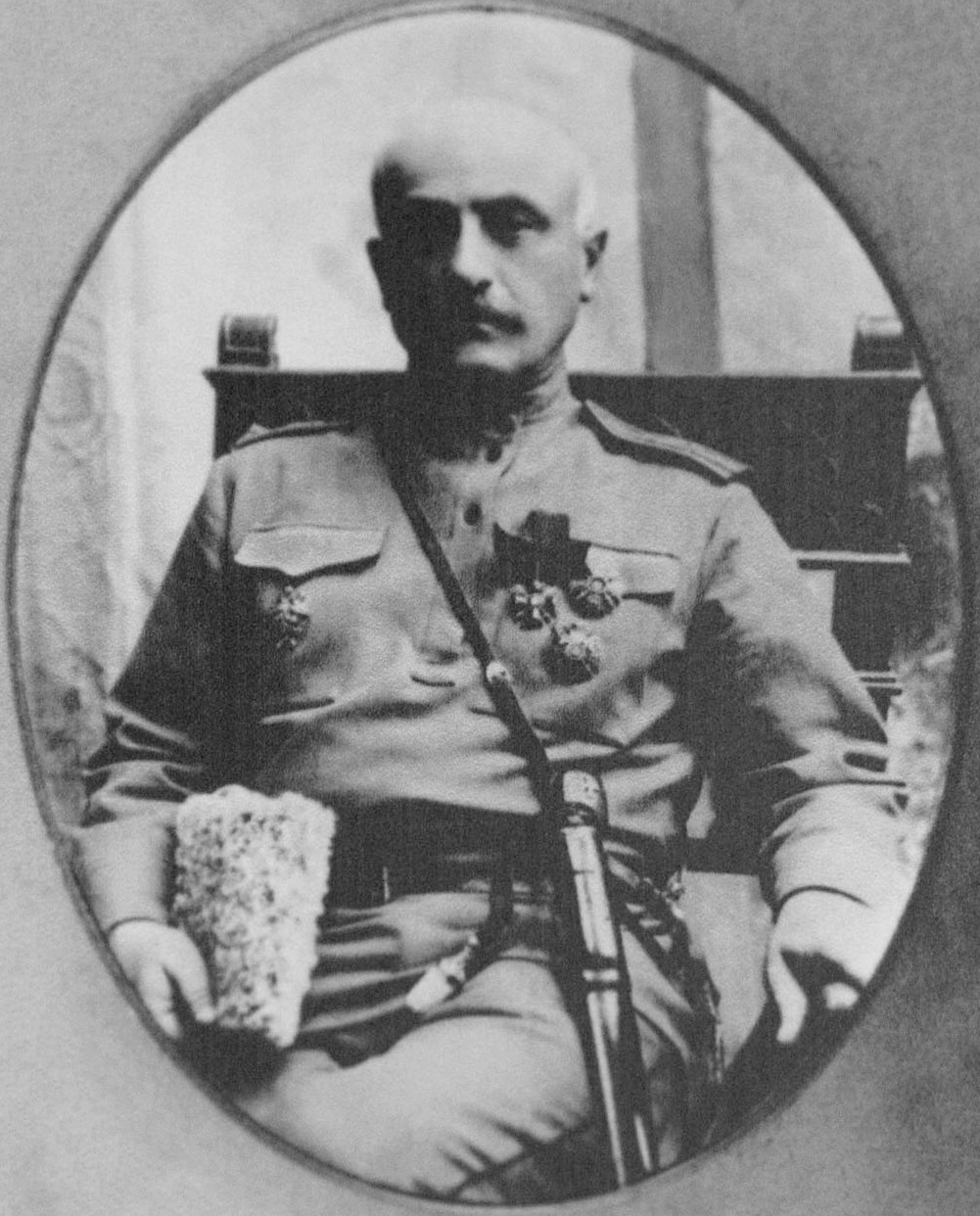
- Born: 22 November 1861; Nakhichevanik, Elisabethpol Governorate, Russian Empire
- Died: 1922 (aged 60–61); Yerevan, Armenian SSR
- Relatives: Poghos Bek-Pirumyan (cousin)
- Military career
- Allegiance: Russian Empire (1881–1917); Republic of Armenia (1918–1920)
- Branch: Army
- Service years: 1881–1920
- Rank: Colonel (Russia); Lieutenant general (Armenia)
- Commands: 3rd Battalion, 153rd Infantry Regiment; 5th Karabakh Regiment
- Conflicts: World War I; Caucasus Campaign; Battle of Sardarabad; Turkish–Armenian War; Battle of Kars
- Awards: see below

Daniel-Bek Abisoghomi Pirumyan (Note: Reformed orthography: Դանիել բեկ Փիրումյան (Փիրումով); Russian: Даниел-бек Абисогомонович Пирумян (Пирумов). Also written Danielbek, Daniel Bek, Daniel Beg or Daniil-Bek; Pirumov, Pirumian. Surname is often spelled Bek-Pirumyan or Bek-Pirumov, although the family name is simply Pirumyan or Pirumov and "Bek" is part of the given name.) (Armenian: Դանիէլ Բէկ Աբիսողոմի Փիրումեան; 22 November 1861 – 1922) was an Armenian military commander who served in the Imperial Russian Army during World War I and in the army of the First Republic of Armenia. He was one of the commanders of Armenian forces at the Battle of Sardarabad. During the Turkish–Armenian War of 1920, he commanded the unsuccessful defense of Kars and was taken prisoner.

== Biography ==
Daniel-Bek Pirumyan was born in 1861 in Nakhichevanik village of the Elisabethpol Governorate of the Russian Empire (now in the disputed region of Nagorno-Karabakh). He graduated from the public school in Shusha and began his service in the Imperial Russian Army in 1881 in Yerevan. He studied at the Tiflis Infantry School and the Infantry Officers' School in Oranienbaum Military Academy. He was promoted to the rank of lieutenant colonel in 1913 and colonel in 1915. During World War I, he fought on the Caucasus Front, commanding the 3rd Battalion of the 153rd Infantry Regiment in Western Armenia. During the Erzurum offensive, he captured the Turkish fort of Dalangez and then fought off the Turkish army trying to reclaim it. Of the 1,400 Russian and Armenian officers and soldiers defending the fort, 1,100 were killed and the survivors were injured. Nevertheless, eight assaults were repulsed by the fort and Dalangez was not given to the enemy.

On 26 May 1918, he participated in the Battle of Sardarabad as general commander of the Sardarabad unit. His cousin Poghos Bek-Pirumyan also participated in the battle as the commander of the 5th Karabakh Regiment. Daniel-Bek held the rank of lieutenant general in the army of the First Republic of Armenia. He commanded Armenian forces at the Battle of Kars and was taken prisoner by Kâzım Karabekir's army after the fall of the city. He was released from imprisonment in October 1921.

Several sources claim that Daniel-Bek Pirumyan was arrested and executed along with other officers in 1921 following the Sovietization of Armenia, either near Dilijan or in Ryazan, and that his cousin Poghos-Bek Pirumyan committed suicide after finding out about this. In reality, Pirumyan, whose health had deteriorated in Turkish captivity, died suddenly in Yerevan in the autumn of 1922, as he was preparing to leave Armenia and join his wife in Moscow. Pirumyan's remains are buried in the courtyard of Saint Gayane Church in Etchmiadzin in Armenia.

== Awards ==
- (Russian Empire) Order of Saint Stanislaus, 2nd class
- (Russian Empire) Order of Saint Stanislaus, 3rd class
- (Russian Empire) Order of St. Anna, 2nd class
- (Russian Empire) Order of St. Anna, 3rd class
- (Russian Empire) Order of St. Anna, 4th class
- (Russian Empire) Order of St. George, 3rd class
- (Russian Empire) Order of St. Vladimir, 3rd class
- (Russian Empire) Gold Sword for Bravery

== Legacy ==
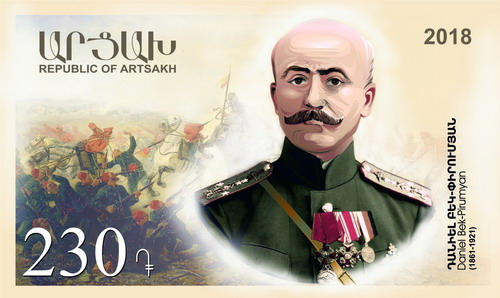
Pirumyan on a 2018 stamp of Artsakh.

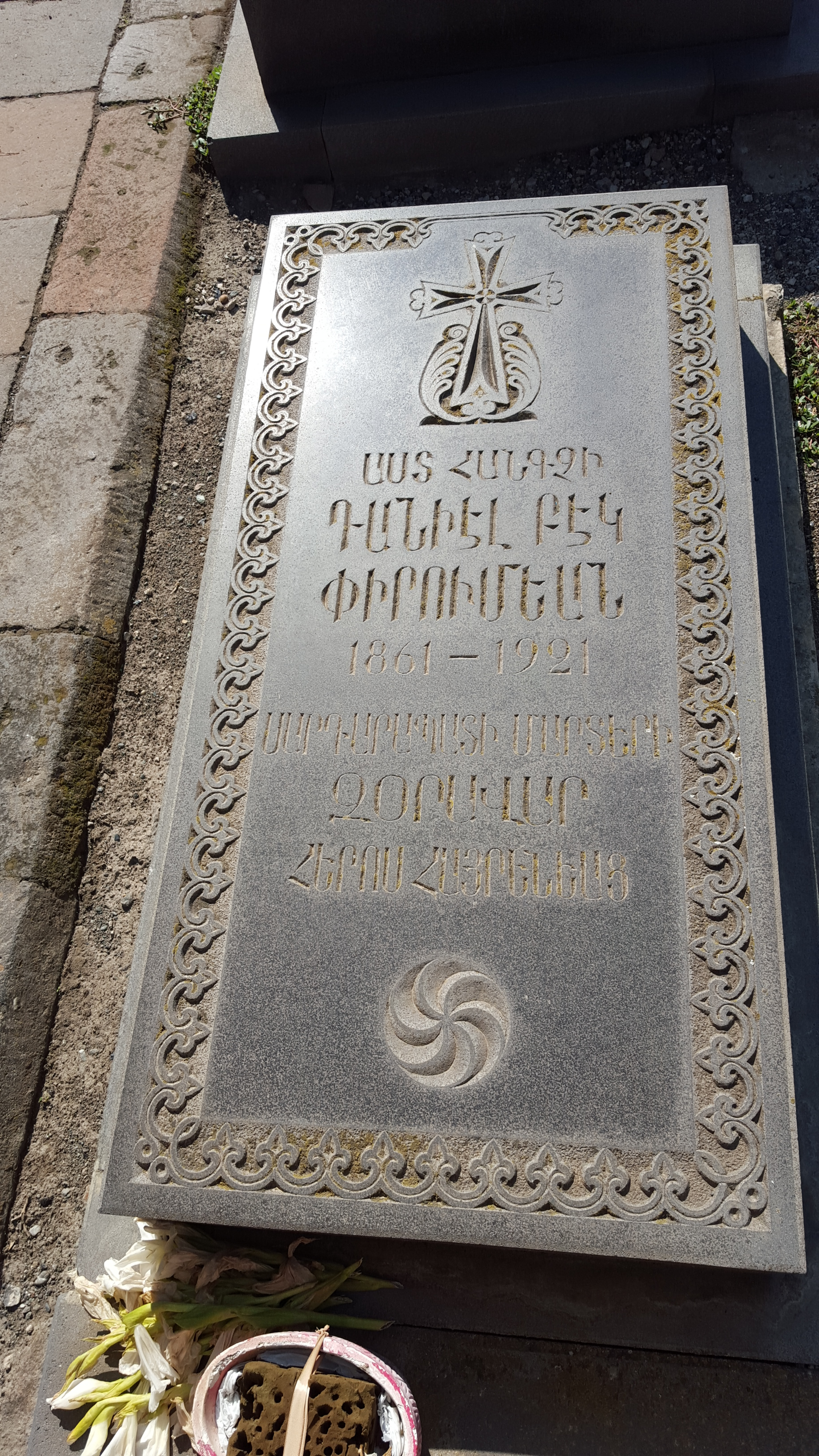
Pirumyan's tombstone in Etchmiadzin

In 2013, Yuri Pirumyan, the grandson of Daniel-Bek, published a book about his grandfather's life titled The Life of Daniel-Bek Pirumyan (Russian: Жизнь Даниэл-бека Пирумяна). Pirumyan wrote the book using archival data, noting that later historical publications contain many facts contradict each other, whereas his book contains documented historical facts.
