= Gazund =

Gazund گزوند
- Village
- Location within Iran
- Coordinates: 32°47′33″N 60°20′25″E
- Country: Iran
- Province: South Khorasan
- County: Darmian
- Bakhsh: Gazik
- Rural District: Tabas-e Masina

Population (2006)
  - Total: 153
- Time zone: UTC+3:30 (IRST)
  - Summer (DST): UTC+4:30 (IRDT)

Gazund (Persian: گزوند, also Romanized as Gazūnd and Gozūnd; also known as Gazand, Garvand, Gazūn, Gazvand, and Kozūn) is a village in Tabas-e Masina Rural District, Gazik District, Darmian County, South Khorasan Province, Iran. At the 2006 census, its population was 153, in 31 families.
