= Varazabun =

Varazabun / Aranzamin Վարազաբուն / Aranzəmin
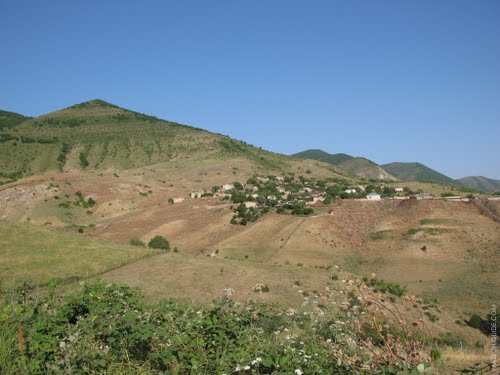
- A view of the village

- Location within Azerbaijan Location within Karabakh Economic Region
- Coordinates: 39°53′40″N 46°53′32″E
- Country: Azerbaijan
  - District: Khojaly

Population (2015)
  - Total: 38
- Time zone: UTC+4 (AZT)

Varazabun (Armenian: Վարազաբուն) or Aranzamin (Armenian: Արանզամին; Azerbaijani: Aranzəmin) is a village in the Khojaly District of Azerbaijan, in the region of Nagorno-Karabakh. Until 2023 it was controlled by the breakaway Republic of Artsakh. The village had an ethnic Armenian-majority population until the expulsion of the Armenian population of Nagorno-Karabakh by Azerbaijan following the 2023 Azerbaijani offensive in Nagorno-Karabakh.

== History ==
During the Soviet period, the village was a part of the Askeran District of the Nagorno-Karabakh Autonomous Oblast.

== Economy and culture ==
The population is mainly engaged in agriculture and animal husbandry. The village is part of the community of Vardadzor.

== Demographics ==
The village has an ethnic Armenian-majority population, had 25 inhabitants in 2005, and 38 inhabitants in 2015.
