= Gogaran =

Gogaran Գոգարան
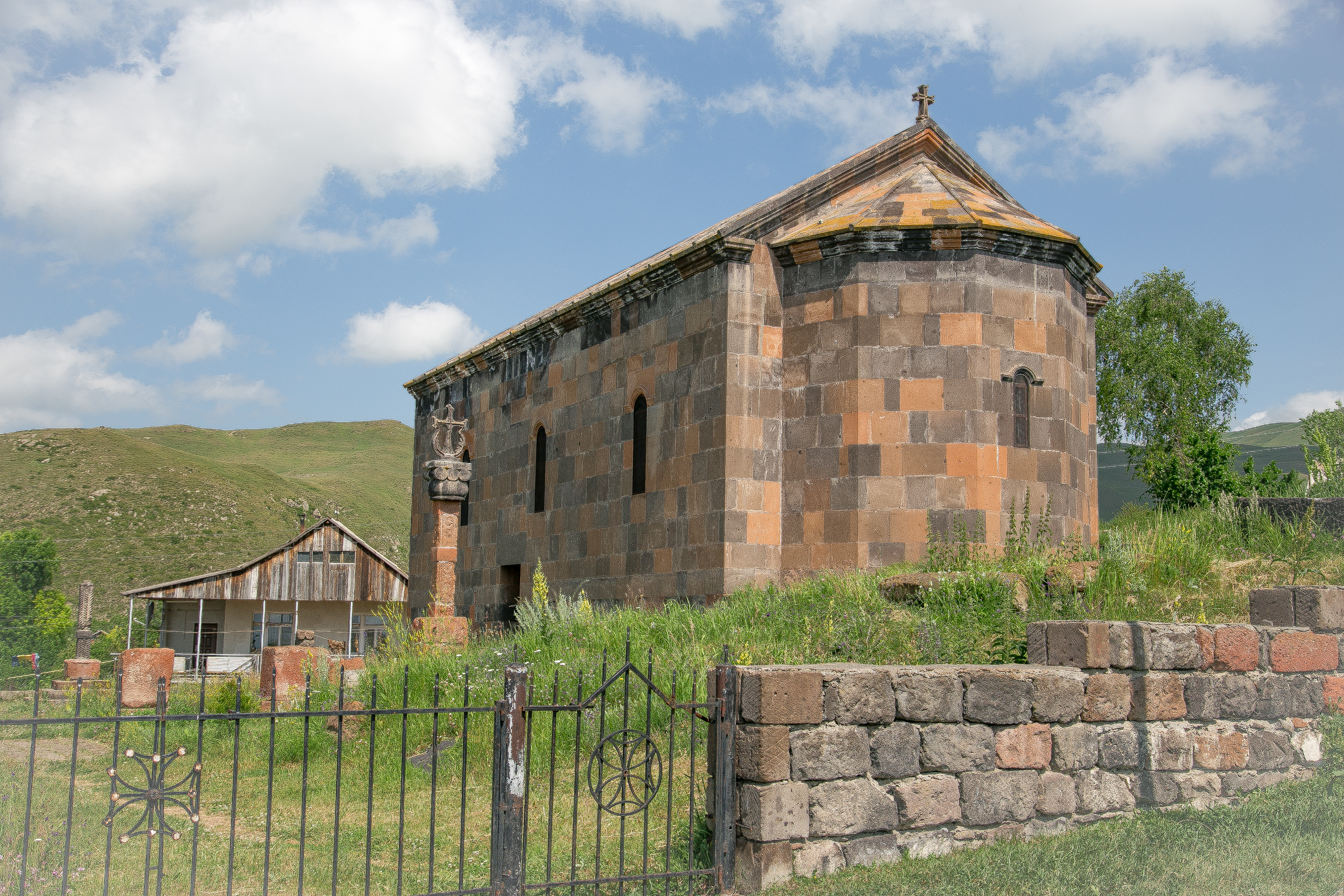
- Church of the Holy Mother of God in Gogaran

- Location within Armenia
- Coordinates: 40°53′44″N 44°11′57″E
- Country: Armenia
- Marz (Province): Lori Province
- Elevation: 1,850 m (6,070 ft)

Population (2011)
  - Total: 1,065
- Time zone: UTC+4 ( )
  - Summer (DST): UTC+5

Gogaran (Armenian: Գոգարան; formerly, Goran), is a village in the Lori Province of Armenia.
