= Vardadzor, Askeran =

Vardadzor / Pirjamal Վարդաձոր / Pircamal
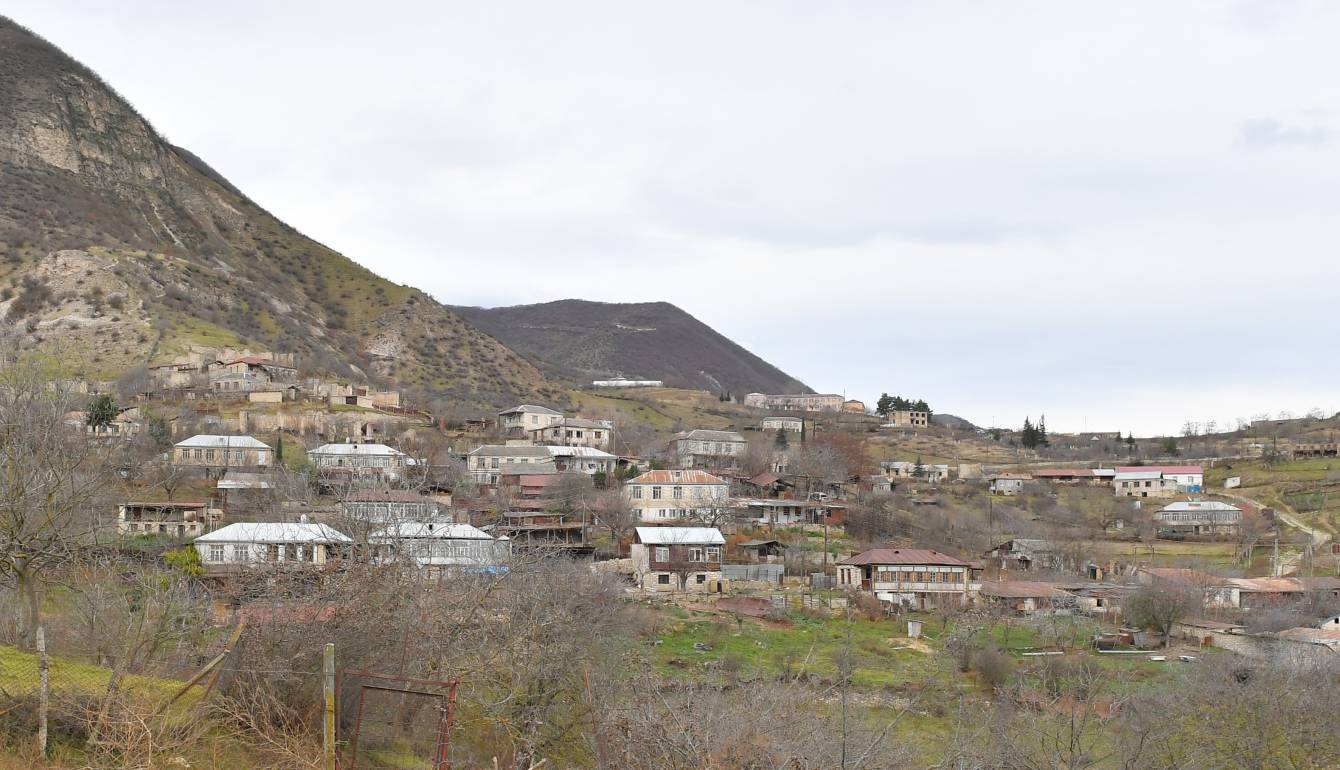
- A view of the village

- Location within Azerbaijan Location within Karabakh Economic Region
- Coordinates: 39°54′01″N 46°53′04″E
- Country: Azerbaijan
  - District: Khojaly

Population (2015)
  - Total: 267
- Time zone: UTC+4 (AZT)

Vardadzor (Armenian: Վարդաձոր) or Pirjamal (Armenian: Փիրջամալ; Azerbaijani: Pircamal) is a village located in the Khojaly District of Azerbaijan, in the disputed region of Nagorno-Karabakh. Until 2023 it was controlled by the breakaway Republic of Artsakh. The village had an ethnic Armenian-majority population until the expulsion of the Armenian population of Nagorno-Karabakh by Azerbaijan following the 2023 Azerbaijani offensive in Nagorno-Karabakh.

== History ==
The village was founded in the 12th century. The village was destroyed during the Armenian–Tatar massacres of 1905–1906, and was later rebuilt in 1918. During the Soviet period, the village was part of the Askeran District of the Nagorno-Karabakh Autonomous Oblast.

== Historical heritage sites ==
Historical heritage sites in and around the village include a 17th/18th-century shrine, an 18th/19th-century cemetery, and the 19th-century church of Surb Astvatsatsin (Armenian: Սուրբ Աստվածածին, lit. 'Holy Mother of God').

== Economy and culture ==
The population is mainly engaged in agriculture and animal husbandry. As of 2015, the village has a municipal building, a house of culture and a medical centre. Students study in the secondary school of the neighboring village of Nakhichevanik. The community of Vardadzor includes the village of Varazabun.

== Demographics ==
The village had 223 inhabitants in 2005, and 267 inhabitants in 2015.

== Gallery ==
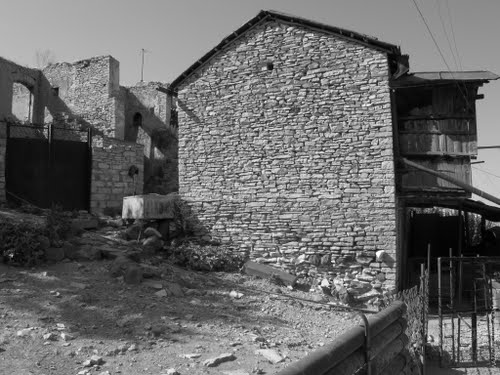
Buildings

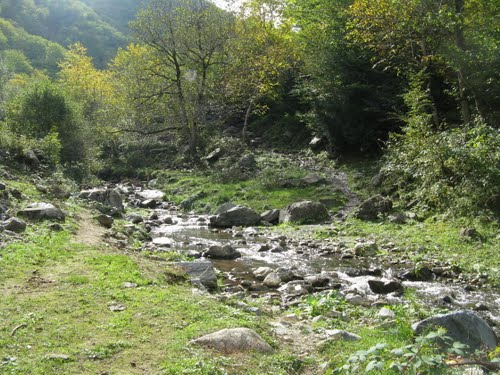
River
