= Goranboy (city) =

- City & Municipality
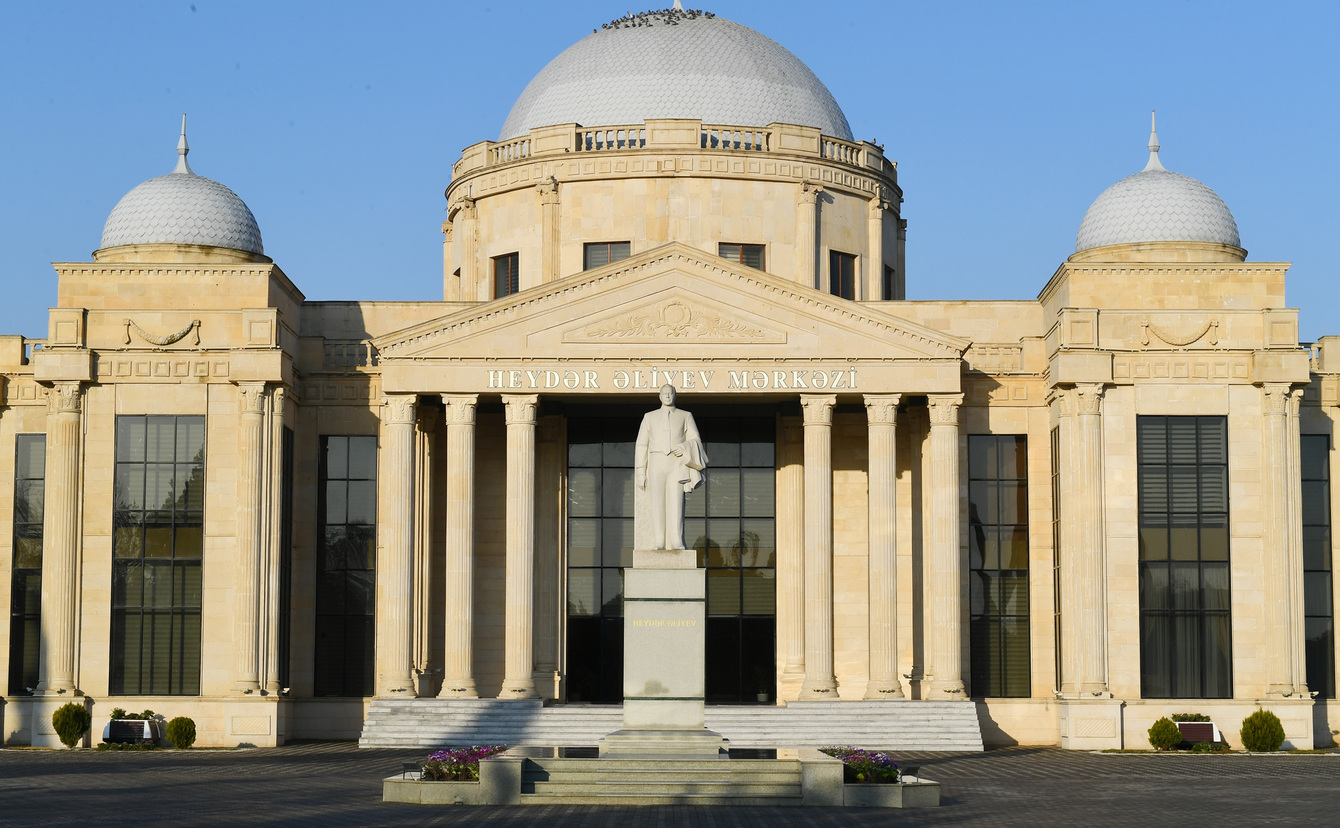

- Location within Azerbaijan
- Coordinates: 40°36′37″N 46°47′23″E
- Country: Azerbaijan
- District: Goranboy
- Established: 1966
- Elevation: 156 m (512 ft)

Population (2021)
  - Total: 10,186
- Time zone: UTC+4 (AZT)
- Area code: +994 22

Goranboy (also, Geran’boy, Geranboi, Kasum-Ismailov, Kasum-Ismailovo, Kasum-Izmaylovo, and Qasym Ismayylov) is the capital city of the Goranboy District of Azerbaijan. The municipality consists of the city of Goranboy and the nearby villages of Qarasüleymanlı, Şahməmmədli, İrəvanlı, and Şurakənd. Vougar Aslanov, a journalist, is from Goranboy.
