= Xan Qərvənd =

- Municipality
- Location within Azerbaijan
- Coordinates: 40°29′55″N 46°54′20″E
- Country: Azerbaijan
- Rayon: Goranboy

Population
  - Total: 3,837
- Time zone: UTC+4 (AZT)
  - Summer (DST): UTC+5 (AZT)

Xan Qərvənd (also, Khan-Gervend and Khankarvend) is a village and municipality in the Goranboy Rayon of Azerbaijan. It has a population of 3,837.
