= Garavand, Eslamabad-e Gharb =

Garavand گراوند
- Village
- Location within Iran
- Coordinates: 33°55′01″N 46°46′24″E
- Country: Iran
- Province: Kermanshah
- County: Eslamabad-e Gharb
- Bakhsh: Homeyl
- Rural District: Harasam

Population (2006)
  - Total: 975
- Time zone: UTC+3:30 (IRST)
  - Summer (DST): UTC+4:30 (IRDT)

Garavand (Persian: گراوند, also Romanized as Garāvand and Garāwand; also known as Garvand) is a village in Harasam Rural District, Homeyl District, Eslamabad-e Gharb County, Kermanshah Province, Iran. At the 2006 census, its population was 975, in 229 families.
