= Qərvənd, Fuzuli =

Qərvənd
- Location within Azerbaijan
- Coordinates: 39°37′56″N 47°13′37″E
- Country: Azerbaijan
- District: Fuzuli

Population
  - Total: 0
- Time zone: UTC+4 (AZT)

Qərvənd (Gervend; also, Qərbənd) is a village in the Fuzuli District of Azerbaijan, around 9 km northeast of Fuzuli City. The site is currently uninhabited.

Following the First Nagorno-Karabakh War, the village fell under the occupation of the unrecognized Republic of Artsakh since August 1993 as a part of its Hadrut Province.

During the 2020 Nagorno-Karabakh conflict, the Ministry of Defence of Azerbaijan announced that it had retaken the village on 27 September 2020. A video released a few weeks later showed that the village was now little more than a scattering of very degraded ruins.
