= Qərvənd, Agdam =

Azeri municipality

Qərvənd is a village and municipality in the Agdam Rayon of Azerbaijan. It has a population of 2,804. The municipality consists of the villages of Orta Qərvənd, Ayaq Qərvənd, Çıraxlı, and Kolqışlaq.
