= Dahraz =

Dahraz Դահրազ
- Dəhrəz
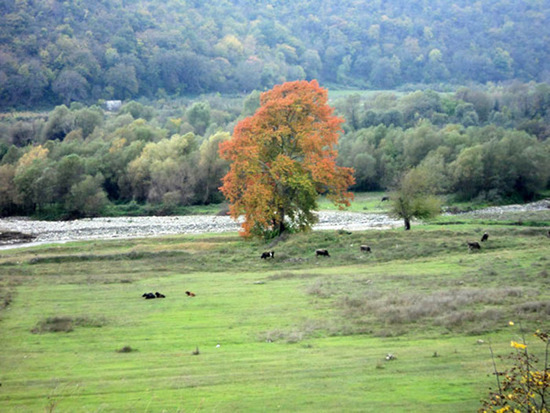
- Scenery around Dahraz

- Location within Azerbaijan Location within Karabakh Economic Region
- Coordinates: 39°52′15″N 46°52′18″E
- Country: Azerbaijan
  - District: Khojaly

Population (2015)
  - Total: 5
- Time zone: UTC+4 (AZT)

Dahraz (Armenian: Դահրազ; Azerbaijani: Dəhrəz) is a village in the Khojaly District of Azerbaijan, in the region of Nagorno-Karabakh. Until 2023 it was controlled by the breakaway Republic of Artsakh. The village had an ethnic Armenian-majority population until the expulsion of the Armenian population of Nagorno-Karabakh by Azerbaijan following the 2023 Azerbaijani offensive in Nagorno-Karabakh.

== History ==
During the Soviet period, the village was a part of the Askeran District of the Nagorno-Karabakh Autonomous Oblast.

== Economy and culture ==
The population is mainly engaged in agriculture and animal husbandry. The village is part of the community of Sarnaghbyur.

== Demographics ==
The village has an ethnic Armenian-majority population, had 8 inhabitants in 2005, and 5 inhabitants in 2015.
