= Goran, Azerbaijan =

Goran
- Municipality
- Location within Azerbaijan
- Coordinates: 40°39′28″N 46°51′09″E
- Country: Azerbaijan
- Rayon: Goranboy

Population
  - Total: 228
- Time zone: UTC+4 (AZT)
  - Summer (DST): UTC+5 (AZT)

Goran (also, Göran and Gëran) is a village and municipality in the Goranboy Rayon of Azerbaijan. It has a population of 228.
