= Nakhichevanik =

Village in Khojaly District, Azerbaijan

Nakhichevanik Նախիջևանիկ
- Naxçıvanlı
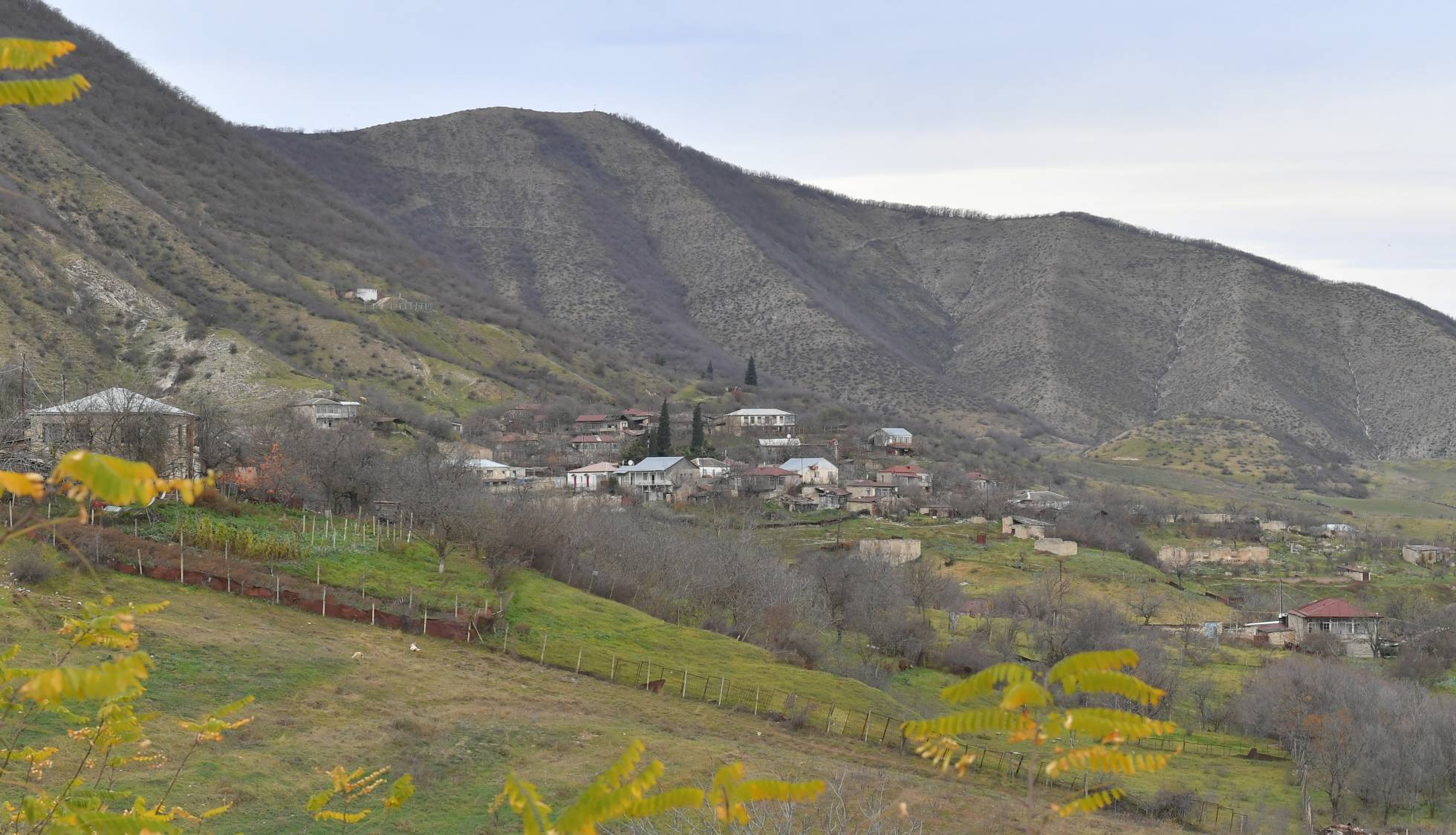
- A view of Nakhichevanik

- Location within Azerbaijan
- Coordinates: 39°54′28″N 46°52′14″E
- Country: Azerbaijan
  - District: Khojaly
- Elevation: 775 m (2,543 ft)

Population (2015)
  - Total: 222
- Time zone: UTC+4 (AZT)

Nakhichevanik (Armenian: Նախիջևանիկ, romanized: Nakhijevanik) or Nakhchivanly (Azerbaijani: Naxçıvanlı) is a village located in the Khojaly District of Azerbaijan, in the region of Nagorno-Karabakh. Until 2023 it was controlled by the breakaway Republic of Artsakh. The village had an ethnic Armenian-majority population until the expulsion of the Armenian population of Nagorno-Karabakh by Azerbaijan following the 2023 Azerbaijani offensive in Nagorno-Karabakh.

== History ==
The modern village was founded in the 15th century. During the Soviet period, the village was part of the Askeran District of the Nagorno-Karabakh Autonomous Oblast.

== Historical heritage sites ==
Historical heritage sites in and around the village include tombs from the 2nd–1st millennia BCE, the abandoned village of Varder from between the 16th and 19th centuries, the 17th-century church of Surb Astvatsatsin (Holy Mother of God), and an 18th/19th-century cemetery.

== Economy and culture ==
The population is mainly engaged in agriculture and animal husbandry. As of 2015, the village has a municipal building, a house of culture, a secondary school, and a medical centre.

== Demographics ==
The village had 211 inhabitants in 2005, and 222 inhabitants in 2015.

== Notable people ==
- Nikolay Karakhan (1900–1970) — Armenian People's Painter of the Uzbek SSR
- Poghos Bek-Pirumyan (1856–1921) — Armenian military commander and national hero
- Daniel Bek-Pirumian (1861–1921) — Armenian military commander and national hero
