= Goranboy District =

District in western Azerbaijan

Coordinates: 40.607621°N 46.792619°E

Goranboy District Goranboy rayonu
- District
- Map of Azerbaijan showing Goranboy District
- Country: Azerbaijan
- Economic region: Ganja-Dashkasan
- Established: 8 August 1930
- Capital: Goranboy
- Settlements: 87

Government
  - Governor: Maharram Guliyev

Area
  - Total: 1,700 km^{2} (660 sq mi)

Population (2020)
  - Total: 105,000
  - Density: 62/km^{2} (160/sq mi)
- Time zone: UTC+4 (AZT)
- Postal code: 2200
- Website: goranboy-ih.gov.az

Goranboy District (Azerbaijani: Goranboy rayonu) is one of the 66 districts of Azerbaijan. Located in the western part of the country within the Ganja-Dashkasan Economic Region, it borders the districts of Aghdara, Kalbajar, Tartar, Yevlakh, Barda, Samukh, Goygol, and completely surrounds the enclave city of Naftalan. Its administrative center and largest urban settlement is the city of Goranboy.

The district covers an area of 1,760 square kilometres (680 sq mi). Goranboy is historically significant as the signing site of the historic Treaty of Gulistan in 1813 at Gulistan village. The region plays a crucial role as a major transit, logistics, and energy corridor, hosting the Baku–Tbilisi–Ceyhan pipeline, the South Caucasus Pipeline, and the primary Baku–Tbilisi railway line. Additionally, Goranboy holds the official title of the Youth Capital of Azerbaijan for the year 2026.

== Geography ==
Goranboy District is situated in western Azerbaijan, occupying a strategically important transition zone between the northern slopes of the Murovdag range of the Lesser Caucasus to the south and the fertile plains of the Kura-Aras Lowland to the north. The district covers a total area of 1,760 square kilometres (680 sq mi). The physical geography is highly diverse: the southwestern terrain is characterized by high mountainous ridges, steep ravines, and river valleys, while the northeastern territory consists mainly of dry semi-desert lowlands and inclined plains.

=== Climate ===
The region experiences a diverse climate pattern due to its sharp elevation contrasts from the Murovdag mountains down to the Kura river basin:

- Lowland regions: The northeastern plains feature a dry semi-arid climate (Köppen classification: BSk) characterized by hot, dry summers and mild winters.
- Foothill and mountainous zones: The southwestern elevated regions feature a moderate, dry subtropical climate with cooler summer temperatures and colder, snowy winters.

The average annual temperature ranges from −1 °C (30 °F) in January in the high mountains to 26.5 °C (79.7 °F) in July in the lowlands. Annual precipitation varies between 300 millimetres (12 in) in the plains to over 600 millimetres (24 in) in the upper mountainous zones.

=== Hydrography ===
Although the Kura River does not flow directly through Goranboy District (forming parts of the adjacent borders with Samukh and Yevlakh districts), the entire river network of Goranboy belongs to the Kura River basin. The major rivers originating from the snow-fed glacier slopes of the Murovdag range include:

- Kurakchay: One of the largest left tributaries of the Kura River in the region, providing vital irrigation for local agriculture.
- Goranchay: Flows directly through the administrative center, the city of Goranboy, nourishing the central agricultural fields.
- Injachay: Originates near Gulistan village and flows down through the southeastern part of the district.
- Korchay: Flows through the eastern plain, where the Korchay Reservoir was constructed to regulate river

== Bordering administrative units ==
Goranboy District shares administrative borders with seven districts and fully enclaves one city:

- North and Northeast: Samukh District, Yevlakh District, and Barda District.
- East and Southeast: Tartar District and Aghdara District.
- South and Southwest: Kalbajar District.
- West: Goygol District.
- Enclave: The district completely surrounds the resort city-enclave of Naftalan.

Additionally, the northeasternmost boundary of the district extends close to the reaches of the Mingachevir Reservoir.

== Etymology ==
The region name is taken from the city of Goranboy which is the administrative centre of the district. This toponym is derived from the word Gerani (the river flowing through the city) and Boyahmedli (former name of the city). Over time, the particle "Ahmedli" was removed from the city's name.

== History ==
Goranboy District was established as an administrative district by decree of the Central Executive Committee of the Azerbaijan SSR on 8 August 1930. In the same year, the Armenian-majority Shahumyan District in what is now southern Goranboy was established by Decision 477 of the executive committee. In 1938, the district and its capital were renamed Gasim Ismailov (Qasım İsmayılov, in Russian Kasum-Ismailovski raion) after the Azerbaijani communist of the same name. The district and city were renamed Goranboy in 1991.

In 1991, during the early phases of the Karabakh conflict, together the Soviet leadership in Azerbaijan and Moscow decided to initiate a campaign of resettlement and disarmament under Operation Ring, where the Armenian residents of the region were deported to Soviet Armenia. Operation Ring was also named Operation Chaykend, the name of the prominent Armenian village of Getashen that fell in the eastern district of Khanlar (now Goygol).

Shahumyan District was merged with the Goranboy District in 1992 and has been repopulated by ethnic Azerbaijanis, most of whom are internally displaced persons who were deported from Nagorno-Karabakh and surrounding districts. The former district and is still claimed by the self-proclaimed Republic of Artsakh as part of its Shahumyan Province.

== Population ==
The population of the region is mainly Azerbaijanis as well as a small number of Russians. Ukrainians. and Belarusians.

Population by towns and regions of the Republic of Azerbaijan (at the beginning of the years, thsd. persons)
	2010	2011	2012	2013	2014	2015	2016	2017	2018	2019	2020	2021
Goranboy region	96.2	96.2	96.9	98.1	99.1	100.2	101.2	102.4	103.3	104.1	105.0	105.6
Urban population	20.3	20.5	20.6	20.8	21.0	21.2	21.5	21.8	22.0	22.2	22.4	22.5
Rural population	75.9	75.7	76.3	77.3	78.1	79.0	79.7	80.6	81.3	81.9	82.6	83.1

== Education ==
There are 30 pre-school children enterprises, 80 secondary schools, 1 technical, secondary and vocational schools in Goranboy region.

Teachers examination in Barda city was held in April 2017, according to the Decree of the Minister of Education of 7 October 2016, in connection with the execution of the Order No. 999 of the President of the Republic dated 16 January 2015. 2433 teachers participated in this examination.

== Local economy ==
Today, Goranboy belongs to Ganja-Kazakh economic region and main sector here is agriculture. Local folk is growing cotton, vegetables, grain, and viticulture. Furthermore, animal husbandry is also pretty common in this area. In Soviet Union times, 21 collective farms and 4 state farms were located in this region.

The institutions operating in the region as "Goran Pambig" a cotton processing company", Goranboy-Wine" a wine-producing enterprise", "Turk Yapı Senaye" construction company, "Gilan holding" construction company and others have a strong impact on the economy of the region and the country.

Also, the Baku-Qazakh highway, the Baku-Tbilisi railway, the Karadag-Agstafa-Tbilisi gas pipeline pass through the district.

== There are historical and architectural monuments named below in the territory of the district ==
- Khankarvend village mosque located Goranboy region was built in 2007 by local residents.
- Khudu baba Mausoleum is located in the Safikurd village of Goranboy.
- 2.5 km north of Goran station, the remains of human settlements dating back to the 1st millennium BC;
- 2 km northeast of the city of Goranboy, the settlement of Kochtepe dating to the Bronze Age;
- Tepayazilan settlement of the Middle Ages near the Kizilhajili settlement, "Tosal ocağı (Tosal furnace)" monument of the VII-VIII centuries near the village of Balakurd;
- 18th century monument near Khan Garvand village;
- A tomb built at the beginning of the 20th century, a castle (13th century) and a mosque built in the 19th century in the village of Safikurd;
- In Rahimli village, the 18th–19th century tomb complex, the 19th century Shatal castle, the 19th century tomb of Mirza Adigözel bey;
- Medieval tombs in Gazanbulag village;
- The fortress of the XIX century in the village of Kurekchay, the fortress of the XII-XVII centuries in the village of Gülüstan.

== See also ==
Administrative divisions of Azerbaijan
