= List of flight attendants =

Notable flight attendants include the following:

- Ron Akana, second-longest-serving flight attendant
- Hokuma Aliyeva, Azerbaijani flight attendant who was killed on Azerbaijan Airlines Flight 8243 in 2024 and was recognised as a National Hero of Azerbaijan.
- Sara Allen, American songwriter, best known for her work with the duo Hall & Oates, having inspired the song "Sara Smile"
- Kathy Augustine, a flight attendant prior to entering Nevada politics
- Pam Baricuatro, the governor of Cebu, Philippines who had worked for Cathay Pacific as a flight attendant
- Rico Barrera, an actor and former reality show contestant (Pinoy Big Brother) who continues to fly with Seair
- Alex Best, ex-wife of George Best
- Neerja Bhanot, was a flight attendant for Pan Am airlines, based in Bombay, India, who died while saving passengers from terrorists on board the hijacked Pan Am Flight 73 on 5 September 1986. She received India's highest civilian award for bravery, the Ashoka Chakra.
- Regina Bird, Big Brother Australia 2003 winner
- Deborah Burlingame, sister of Charles "Chic" Burlingame III, pilot of hijacked American Airlines Flight 77
- Nh. Dini, Indonesian novelist and mother of French director Pierre Coffin. Worked as a Garuda Indonesian Airways flight attendant during her early life
- Betty Ong, was a flight attendant on board American Airlines Flight 11 the first of four hijacked aircraft on the morning of 11 September 2001.
- Madeline Amy Sweeney, was also a flight attendant on board Flight 11, Sweeney was the first to describe the hijackers, and their actions.
- Beverly Lynn Burns, American Airlines stewardess class of 1971; first woman Boeing 747 Captain in the world July 1984
- Terence Cao, Singaporean actor
- Skye Chan, 2008 Miss Hong Kong first runner-up and Miss World 2008 contestant, artist with TVB
- Ellen Church, first female flight attendant in history
- Uli Derickson, on duty during the TWA Flight 847 hijacking
- Brian Dowling, UK Big Brother 2001 winner
- Gaëtan Dugas, alleged Patient Zero for acquired immune deficiency syndrome
- Ruth Carol Taylor, first verified African-American stewardess, hired by Mohawk Airlines in 1958
- Roz Hanby, face of the British Airways "Fly the Flag" campaign (1970s/1980s)
- Barbara Jane Harrison, posthumously awarded the George Cross for bravery
- Alice Hoagland (1949–2020), activist and mother of United Airlines Flight 93 passenger Mark Bingham
- Ann Hood, American novelist and short story writer; she has also written nonfiction
- Jennifer Hosten, 1970 Miss World winner
- Nexar Antonio Flores, Ecuadorian-Finnish artist
- Patricia Ireland, former President of the National Organization for Women
- Kris Jenner, was a flight attendant, for a year, before marrying Robert Kardashian
- Annita Keating, Dutch-born estranged wife of former Australian prime minister Paul Keating, who flew with KLM and Alitalia prior to her marriage
- Sonija Kwok, 1999 Miss Hong Kong, now a popular artist with TVB
- Evangeline Lilly, Canadian actress, who coincidentally played a plane crash survivor on Lost, worked for Royal Airlines.
- Katherine Lee, American flight attendant famous for her finger wag in Delta Air Lines' in-flight safety video, which became a hit on YouTube
- Kate Linder, actress on The Young and the Restless, who continues to fly with United Airlines on weekends when not filming
- Sharon Luk, 2005 Miss Hong Kong First Runner-up, artist with TVB
- Gabriele von Lutzau (born Gabriele Dillmann), a flight attendant on hijacked Lufthansa Flight 181, praised for her loyalty to the passengers and crew. In the aftermath, she was named "Der Engel von Mogadischu" (The Angel of Mogadishu).
- Catherine Maunoury, French winner of the Aerobatics World Championship in 1988 and 2000
- Pamela Bianca Manalo, a flight attendant for Philippine Airlines before she was crowned Miss Philippines-Universe in 2009
- Carole Middleton, mother of Catherine, Princess of Wales
- Avis Miller, Playboy Playmate Miss November 1970
- Jane McGrath, co-founder of the McGrath Foundation for breast cancer.
- Nyla Murphy, lawyer, real estate broker, member of the Wyoming House of Representatives
- Naila Nazir, Pakistani air hostess who received 1985's Flight Safety Foundation (FSF) Heroism Award for bravely handling a tense and dangerous situation during the Pakistan International Airlines Flight 326 hijacking
- Bette Nash, the world's longest-serving flight attendant at the time of her death in 2024
- Sara Netanyahu, wife of Israeli Prime Minister Benjamin Netanyahu, former El Al flight attendant
- Froso Papaharalambous, singer
- Iris Peterson, flew for United Airlines from 1946 until 2007, retiring at the age of 85
- Lyudmila Putina, former wife of Russian president Vladimir Putin, a flight attendant early in her career
- Doria Ragland, social worker, yoga instructor, and mother of Meghan, Duchess of Sussex
- Robert Reardon, retired from Delta Air Lines at the age of 90 as the world's longest serving flight attendant and also the oldest active flight attendant
- Linda Louise Rowley, former beauty queen who held the title Miss Alaska USA
- Lee Seung-yeon, Korean actress/talk show host
- Jóhanna Sigurðardóttir, Icelandic Airlines, former Prime Minister of Iceland and first openly LGBT Head of Government
- Ellen Simonetti, first flight attendant to be fired for blogging
- Steven Slater, who quit after the airplane landed and activated the emergency evacuation slide
- Tania Soni, beauty pageant winner
- Mitsuko Tottori is the current president and CEO of Japan Airlines, appointed in April 2024. She is also the first former flight attendant to lead JAL, having started her career in 1985 with Toa Domestic Airlines, which later merged with JAL.
- Silver Tree, writer and producer
- Vesna Vulović, Guinness world record holder for surviving the highest fall without a parachute
- Julie Woodson, Playboy Playmate Miss April 1973
- Ziana Zain, Malaysian international artist, model, actress
- Ant (real name Anthony Steven Kalloniatis), TV personality Celebrity Fit Club former American Airlines flight attendant
- Queen Silvia of Sweden, briefly a flight attendant before marrying King Carl XVI Gustaf of Sweden
