= Hokuma =

Hokuma (Azerbaijani: Hökumə, also Hökümə) is a feminine given name, commonly used in Azerbaijan. Notable people with the name include:

- Hokuma Aliyeva (1991–2024), Azerbaijani flight attendant
- Hokuma Gurbanova (1913–1988), Azerbaijani and Soviet actress
- Hokuma Sultanova (1909–1981), Azerbaijani and Soviet public and political figure
