= Igor Kshnyakin =

Azerbaijani pilot (1962–2024)

- Born: 19 May 1962; Baku, Azerbaijan SSR, USSR
- Died: 25 December 2024 (aged 62); Aktau, Kazakhstan
- Cause of death: Aircraft accident
- Resting place: II Alley of Honor, Baku, Azerbaijan
- Occupation: Pilot

Igor Ivanovich Kshnyakin (Azerbaijani: İqor İvanoviç Kşnyakin; 19 May 1962 – 25 December 2024) was an Azerbaijani commercial airline captain who was recognized as a National Hero of Azerbaijan.

Kshnyakin is notable for his heroic efforts to save passengers' lives during the crash of Azerbaijan Airlines Flight 8243 in 2024, during which he died.

== Life and career ==
Igor Kshnyakin was born on 19 May 1962, in Baku, Azerbaijan SSR, USSR. In 1982, he received his initial pilot training at the Sasovo Civil Aviation Flight School, specializing as a pilot. In 1992, he graduated from the Russian State Hydrometeorological University with a degree in Meteorology.

Kshnyakin began his aviation career in 1982 as a second pilot of an An-2 aircraft with the Yevlakh United Aviation Detachment. On 6 January 1984, he joined the Zabrat United Aviation Detachment as a second pilot of an An-2 aircraft. By 1990, he was serving as a second pilot of a Yak-40 aircraft under the Azerbaijan Civil Aviation Administration.

In 1994, he was promoted to captain of a Yak-40 aircraft, and in 1997, he became captain of the Yak-40 for Azerbaijan's national aviation company, Azerbaijan Airlines. In 1998, he transitioned to a second pilot position for the Tupolev Tu-134 aircraft. By 2005, he was captain of an An-140 aircraft, and in 2008, he was elevated to captain of the ATR-42/72 aircraft. From 3 June 2013, after successfully completing training for Embraer 170/190 aircraft, he was appointed a trainee pilot for the Embraer-170/190. On 11 December 2013, Kshnyakin became a captain of the Embraer-170/190 aircraft for the Flight Services Department of Azerbaijan Airlines. Kshnyakin was a highly experienced airline captain with a career spanning decades at Azerbaijan Airlines. He logged 15,000 flight hours, including 11,200 hours as captain. According to Azerbaijan Airlines, he had extensive expertise with modern aviation technologies.

Kshnyakin had two daughters.

== Death ==
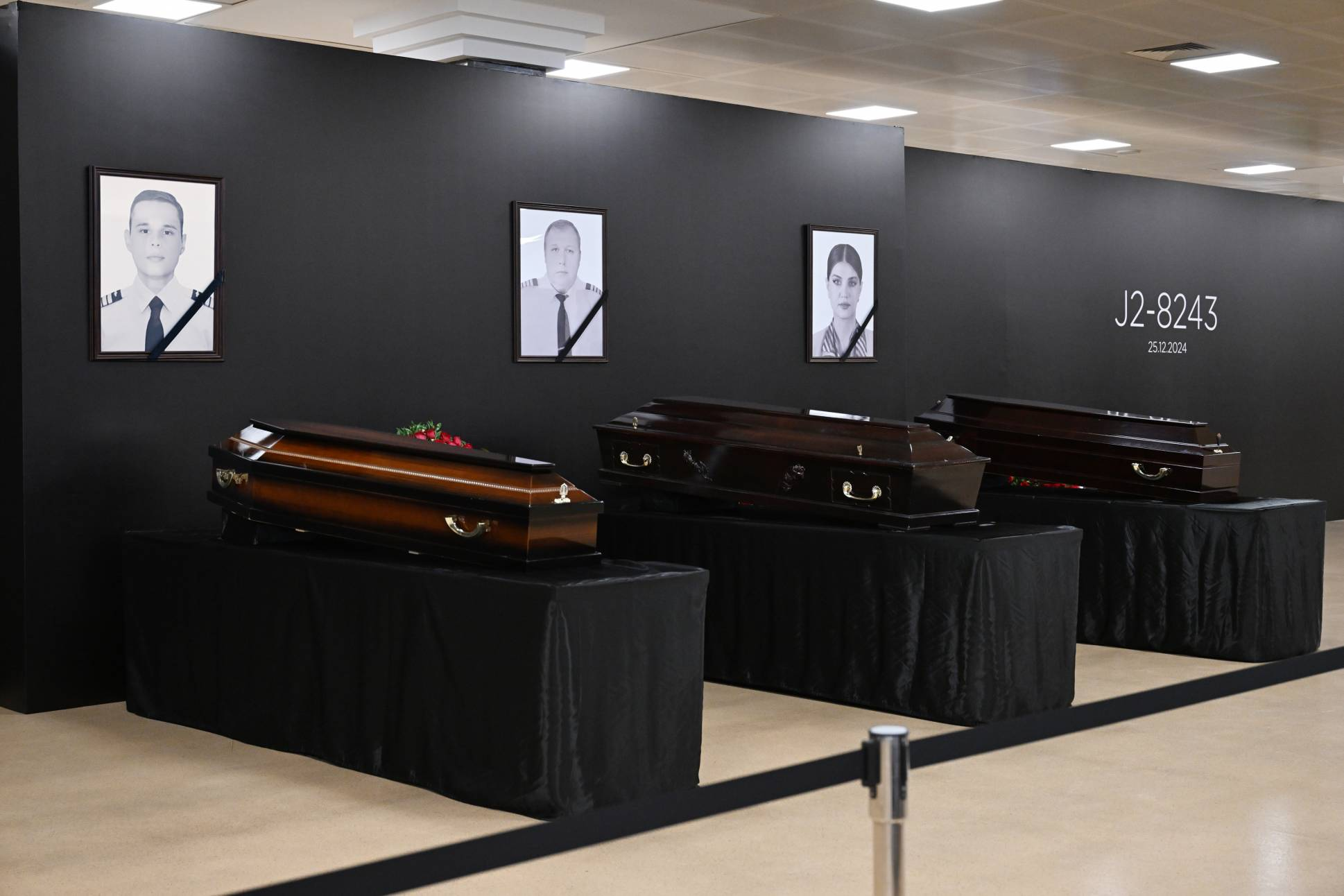
The farewell ceremony for the deceased crew members of Flight 8243, Heydar Aliyev International Airport (Kshnyakin's coffin is centre)

On 25 December 2024, Azerbaijan Airlines Flight 8243, an Embraer E190AR aircraft, was struck by a Russian Pantsir-S1 missile system. Despite the failure of the control systems, Kshnyakin and co-pilot Aleksandr Kalyaninov steered the aircraft, over the Caspian Sea, towards an area near Aktau International Airport. During the emergency landing near Aktau, Kazakhstan, the plane crashed.

The aircraft carried 67 people: 62 passengers and 5 crew members. Twenty-nine individuals survived the crash. Kshnyakin died in the crash. His heroism was widely honored in Azerbaijan and Kazakhstan, and in international aviation circles. He and his team were described as having "entered history as heroes." Kshnyakin was buried on 29 December 2024, at the II Alley of Honor.

== Awards ==
On 29 December 2024, by the decree of the President of the Republic of Azerbaijan, Igor Ivanovich Kshnyakin was posthumously awarded the title of "National Hero of Azerbaijan".

== See also ==
- Hokuma Aliyeva, flight attendant who died in the same accident
