= Fuad Gasimzade =

Azerbaijani philosopher and academician

- Born: 22 October 1929; Baku, Azerbaijan SSR
- Died: 3 August 2010 (aged 80); Baku, Azerbaijan
- Occupations: Scientist and philosopher

Academic background
- Education: Baku State University

Fuad Gasimzade (22 October 1929 – 3 August 2010) was an Azerbaijani philosopher and academician. His main area of research area was Azerbaijani philosophic public opinion, social philosophy, ontology, epistemology and aesthetics.

His doctoral thesis was titled "Fizuli’s outlook”. His monograph "Caravan of sorrow" or "Light in the darkness" was printed in 1968. He wrote more than 20 scientific articles about Fizuli.

Fuad Gasimzade wrote the book titled “Sport, beauty and aesthetics”. It was printed in 1970.

== Biography ==
Fuad Gasimzade was born on 22 October 1929 in Baku. In 1947, he graduated from Boys' School No. 1. In 1952, he graduated from the Faculty of Philosophy of Baku State University. He received the title of Candidate of Philosophical Sciences in 1955, and earned a Doctor of Philosophy in 1966. He was elected a corresponding member of the Academy of Sciences of Azerbaijan in 1989. He became a full member in 2001. He died on 3 August 2010 in Baku. Fuad Gasimzade was buried in the II alley of Honor in Baku.

== Scientific publications ==
1. "Caravan of Grief, or light in the dark", 1968
2. "Sport, beauty and esthetic ", 1970
3. "Dialectical materialism", 1971
4. "Two phenomena and islam", 2000
5. "The views of Qudsi", 2000–2001
