= Shashikala (given name) =

Shashikala is a given name. Notable people with the name include:

- Shashikala (1932–2021), Indian actress
- Shashikala Dahal, Nepalese politician
- Shashikala Dani (born 1959), Indian artist
- Shashikala Gurpur (born 1964), Indian author
- Shashikala Annasaheb Jolle (born 1969), Indian social worker and politician
- Shashikala Kakodkar (1935–2016), Indian politician
- Shashikala Kumarasinghe (born 1984), Sri Lankan archer
- Shashikala Manandhar (born 1960), Nepalese novelist
- Shashikala Sinha, Indian scientist
- Shashikala Siriwardene (born 1985), Sri Lankan cricketer
