= Shashikala Sinha =

Indian missile scientist

- Occupation: Indian missile scientist
- Employer(s): Defence Research and Development Organisation (DRDO), Government of India
- Known for: Project Director in Indian Ballistic Missile Defence Programme

Shashikala Sinha is an Indian scientist. She is known for her role as a project director in the Endo-Atmospheric Interceptor Missile Advanced Area Defence programme, part of the Indian Ballistic Missile Defence Programme. As of 2019 she is graded as a 'Scientist H' in the Defence Research and Development Organisation (DRDO) and leads a team of around 300 scientists.

== Life ==
Shashikala Sinha was born in Madurai, Tamil Nadu. Her father was a military engineer, as a result he would travel across India as duty called. She was schooled in St. Ann's High School, Secunderabad, St Francis College for Women and then Osmania University in Hyderabad. She joined DRDO, but left within a year so she could complete her masters in engineering from Indian Institute of Technology Kharagpur, where she also met her husband. After this she joined the Society of Microwave Engineering but left in 1989 after the birth of her first daughter. Her husband was an Indian Navy officer. They had two daughters. In 1997, her husband died in a car accident.

She joined Research Centre Imarat, a DRDO missile research facility, in 1997 on contract basis, and by 2001 she was a full-time scientist. She began working on 'RF sensors subsystem' for which her team was awarded the Agni Award for Excellence in 2007. By 2012, she was the project director for the Advanced Air Defence programme and by 2017 was leading a team of around 300 scientists. She has expertise in the development of aircraft, radomes and radar cross sections. As of 2017 she is graded as a Scientist G (Level 14).
