= Azerbaijan Airlines Flight 8243 =

2024 aircraft shootdown over Russia

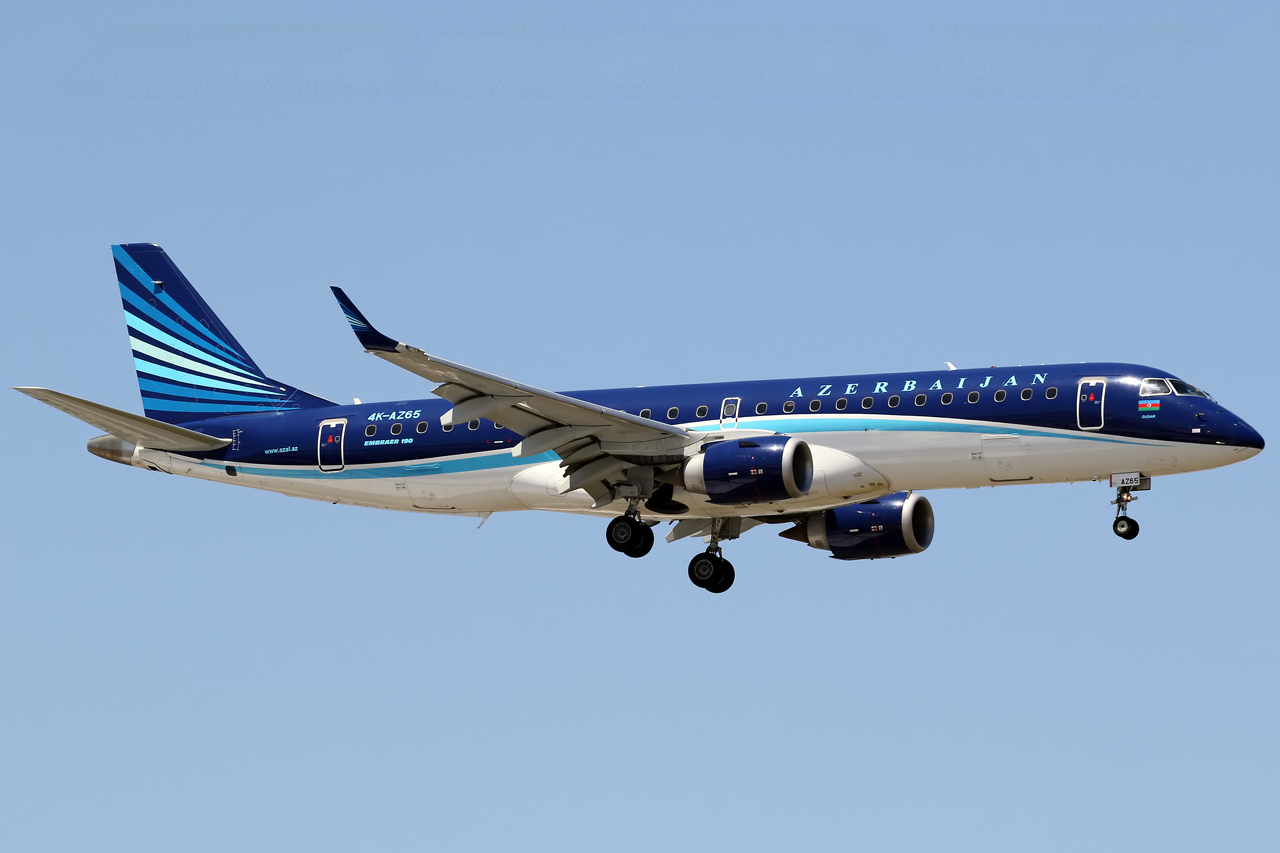
- 4K-AZ65, the aircraft involved, photographed in 2016

Shootdown
- Date: 25 December 2024
- Summary: Crashed during emergency landing after being hit by fragments of an air defense missile
- Site: Near Aktau International Airport, Aktau, Kazakhstan; 43°52′57″N 51°00′36″E

Aircraft
- Aircraft type: Embraer E190AR
- Aircraft name: Gusar
- Operator: Azerbaijan Airlines
- IATA flight No.: J28243
- ICAO flight No.: AHY8243
- Call sign: AZAL 8243
- Registration: 4K-AZ65
- Flight origin: Heydar Aliyev International Airport, Baku, Azerbaijan
- Destination: Kadyrov Grozny International Airport, Chechnya, Russia
- Occupants: 67
- Passengers: 62
- Crew: 5
- Fatalities: 38
- Injuries: 29
- Survivors: 29

Azerbaijan Airlines Flight 8243 was a scheduled international passenger flight from Heydar Aliyev International Airport in Baku, Azerbaijan, to Kadyrov Grozny International Airport near Grozny, Russia, operated by Azerbaijan Airlines. On 25 December 2024, the Embraer E190 operating the flight was severely damaged by a Russian surface-to-air missile during the aircraft's approach to Grozny. The pilots attempted to divert but the hydraulic system failed, leading to a loss of control and ultimately a crash near Aktau International Airport in Aktau, Kazakhstan, with 62 passengers and five crew on board. Of those 67 people, 38 died in the accident, including both of the pilots and a flight attendant, while 29 people survived with injuries.

Approximately 40 minutes after takeoff, as the aircraft entered Russian airspace and neared Grozny, the crew reported losing GPS navigational aids, due to jamming. Foggy conditions were also reported by the airport. As the plane approached its destination, 81 minutes into the flight, passengers reported an explosion and shrapnel striking the aircraft. In radio transmissions, the pilots attributed the event to a bird strike and requested a diversion. They initiated emergency protocols, including squawking 7700 on the transponder, and redirected the flight over the Caspian Sea toward Kazakhstan.

However, after the crash, the aircraft was found to be riddled with holes in its fuselage, some containing fragments of foreign metal objects, damage inconsistent with a bird strike but resembling the impact of a surface-to-air missile. On 26 December, Euronews reported that Azerbaijani officials had determined the plane had been hit mid-flight by a Russian missile during efforts to repel a Ukrainian drone attack amid the Russo-Ukrainian war. Shrapnel from the blast injured several passengers and cabin crew. On 27 December, The New York Times reported that Azerbaijani investigators believed a Russian Pantsir-S1 air-defence system had damaged the plane before it crashed. On 4 February, Reuters reported that investigators had recovered a fragment of a Pantsir-S missile from inside the fuselage.

On 28 December, Russian President Vladimir Putin apologised to the President of Azerbaijan, Ilham Aliyev, for the "tragic incident" involving the aircraft in Russian airspace. He stated that Ukrainian drones had been targeting Grozny at the time and that Russian air defences had repelled these attacks, but he did not confirm that the flight had been shot down nor acknowledged Russian responsibility. On 29 December, President Aliyev said that Russia had accidentally shot down the plane, accused Russia of attempting to obfuscate and "hush up" the crash, and demanded a full admission of guilt, punishment for those responsible, and compensation for the victims and their families. On 9 October 2025, Putin admitted that the plane was accidentally downed by a Russian missile, suggesting that the missile detonated several meters away from the aircraft.

On 15 April 2026, the Russian and Azerbaijani Foreign Ministries issued a joint statement that the parties had agreed on a settlement, including compensation, and that the crash was caused by an unintentional air defense strike in Russian airspace.

== Background ==
In the weeks preceding the crash of Flight 8243 on 25 December 2024, Chechnya's capital, Grozny, was under increased military tension due to repeated Ukrainian drone attacks following Russian invasion of Ukraine. On 12 December, a drone strike damaged a Chechen OMON police regiment facility, injuring several personnel; similar strikes had occurred on 4 December and earlier that autumn. As a result, Russian authorities reportedly employed heightened air defense and electronic warfare systems, including GPS jamming, to repel suspected drone incursions in the region.

This elevated military posture persisted through late December. On the day of the crash, airspace over Grozny was subject to an active no-fly zone, purportedly aimed at countering drone threats—despite ongoing civilian traffic and with visibility impacted by dense fog.

=== Aircraft ===
The aircraft involved, which was manufactured on 26 June 2013, was an Embraer E190AR (Advanced Range), the longest range variant of the aircraft. It was registered as 4K-AZ65, and named Gusar after the Azerbaijan regional capital city. It was powered by two General Electric CF34-10E6G07 engines, and underwent its last maintenance on 18 October 2024. Since 2013, the aircraft was operated by the airline, except from 2017 to 2023, when it flew under the airline's subsidiary Buta Airways. The aircraft was 11 years old at the time of the crash and had logged around 15,257 flight hours.

=== Passengers and crew ===
There were 62 passengers on board. Among them, 37 passengers were citizens of Azerbaijan, 16 of Russia, six of Kazakhstan, and three of Kyrgyzstan. Two children were on board.

The aircraft had a crew of five: two pilots and three flight attendants, all of whom were Azerbaijanis. Captain Igor Kshnyakin was the pilot in command while his copilot was First Officer Aleksandr Kalyaninov. Kshnyakin had over 15,000 hours of flight time.

Nationalities
Country	Passengers	Crew	Total	Surviving passengers	Surviving crew	Reference
Azerbaijan	37	5	42	14	2	
Kazakhstan	6	—N/a	6	—N/a	—N/a	
Kyrgyzstan	3	—N/a	3	3	—N/a	
Russia	16	—N/a	16	9	—N/a	
Total	62	5	67	26	2	

== Accident ==
ADS-B tracking data of the flight in red with its origin (Heydar Aliyev International Airport) marked by the blue airport icon, its intended destination (Kadyrov Grozny International Airport) by the grey airport icon, and the crash site (near Aktau International Airport) by the red fire icon. There is a large gap in the data which begins before the final approach to Grozny; the aircraft's signal was not reacquired until it neared the Caspian Sea coast of Kazakhstan. (map data)

The flight, with a scheduled takeoff time of 08:10, took off from Heydar Aliyev International Airport, Baku, at 07:55 for Kadyrov Grozny International Airport with a scheduled arrival at 09:10.

Approximately 40 minutes after takeoff, as the aircraft entered Russian airspace near Grozny, the crew reported to air traffic control that it had lost GPS navigational aids. At the same time, the aircraft's Automatic Dependent Surveillance–Broadcast (ADS-B) signal, a system used for real-time aircraft tracking, also disappeared. These occurrences strongly indicate that the aircraft was subjected to "GPS jamming." Such interference is prohibited under international regulations established by the International Telecommunication Union and the International Civil Aviation Organization, both of which count Russia as a member. Despite these regulations, GPS jamming has been employed by the Russian military to counter Ukrainian drone operations. GPS jamming has become a recurring issue for flights and is frequently encountered when entering Russian airspace.

As the plane approached Grozny, passengers reported an explosion and shrapnel striking the aircraft. At 09:16 AZT the crew reported a "control failure" due to a "bird strike in the cockpit." They asked to divert to Mineralnye Vody Airport, but upon hearing about the weather conditions, asked instead to divert to Uytash Airport in Makhachkala. Shortly after, at 09:22 AZT, the crew reported a hydraulics failure. Air traffic controllers told the crew not to attempt a landing in Makhachkala due to poor weather. The crew issued a distress signal by squawking 7700 at 09:25, reporting a failure of the control system.

At 09:49, the pilots requested an emergency landing at Aktau International Airport and attempted to manage the approach in direct mode, with the estimated landing time set for 10:25 (11:25 Kazakhstan time AQTT, UTC+05:00). At 10:00 (11:00 AQTT), the Emergency Situations Department of the Mangystau Region sent emergency response teams and resources to Aktau airport.

The plane entered Kazakh airspace at 10:02, reappearing on ADS-B at 10:07 while flying over the Caspian Sea towards Aktau. Altitude and speed data from ADS-B transmissions indicated the aircraft experienced extremely varying altitude and speed values.

Unable to land on the first attempt, the aircraft initiated a go-around manoeuvre to re-position for another runway approach. As it was making a third turn, at 10:28, communication between the pilots and air traffic control was lost. At 10:30, the airliner struck the ground three kilometres (1.9 mi; 1.6 nmi) from the airport, with its right wing hitting first. It then tumbled, exploded, and broke into two major pieces. The explosion, combined with the fire that broke out after the plane crashed, destroyed the front section of the plane. The tail section of the plane came to rest upside down away from the main wreckage, and remained largely intact. The crash was captured on video, which showed that the landing gear was deployed when the plane hit the ground. Additional resources and personnel from the Emergency Situations Department, initially stationed at the Aktau airport, arrived at the scene at 10:35 and were deployed at an elevated emergency rank, extinguishing the fire by 11:05 AZT (12:05 AQTT). A surviving crew member said that the pilots initially ordered them to prepare for a water landing before changing to a ground landing.

Of the 67 people on board, 29 survived, and 38 died. Of the five crew members aboard, two flight attendants survived, and both pilots and one flight attendant were killed. Authorities said all of the fatalities occurred at the scene. The 29 survivors, including two children, were hospitalised following the accident for injuries that included closed craniocerebral injuries, brain concussion, closed chest injuries, and traumatic shocks. Most of the survivors were believed to have been seated in the rear section of the aircraft, and 11 survivors were in critical condition.

== Aftermath ==
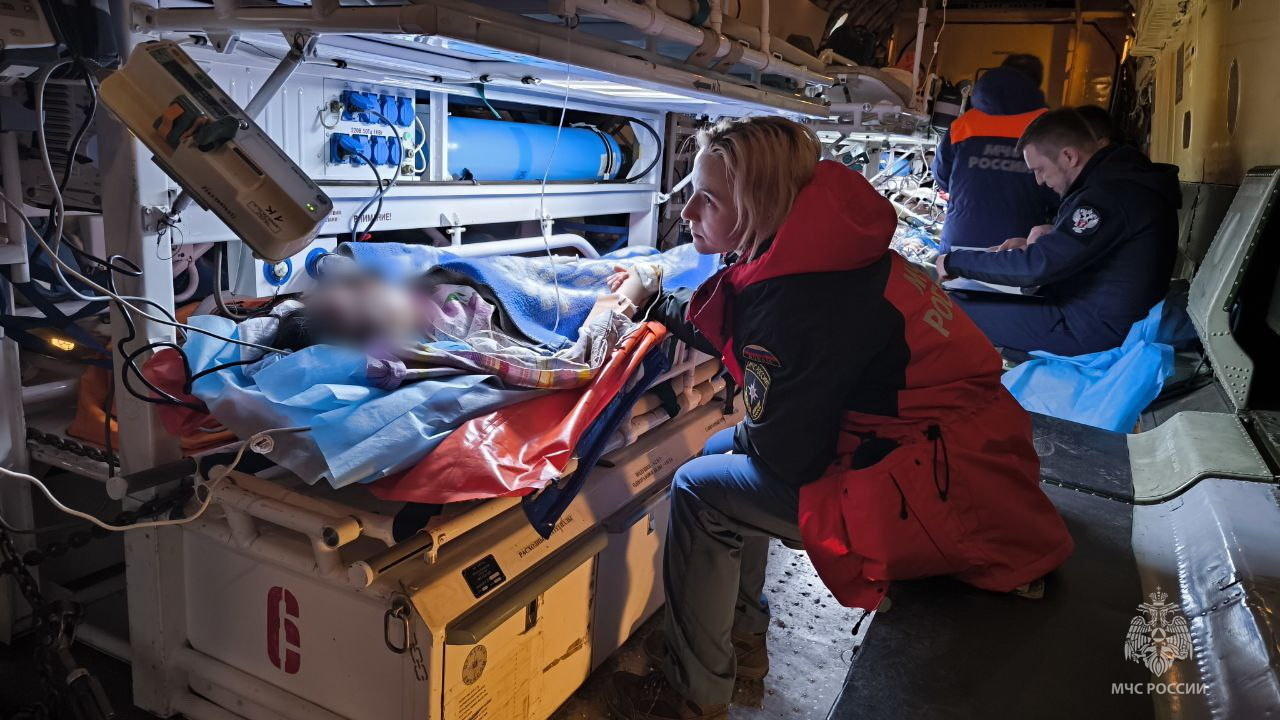
Transportation to Moscow of Russian citizens injured in the crash of Flight 8243

Following the accident, a state of emergency was declared in Tupkaragan District, where the aircraft crashed. A total of 482 emergency response personnel, 97 pieces of special equipment, 10 canine brigades, and two aircraft were deployed to the crash site. Additional doctors were flown in from Astana to treat the injured. The Blood Centre of the Mangystau Region reached out to the public, asking that healthy people donate blood. Soon after, residents of Aktau arrived at the centre to donate their blood, with around 300 participating. Residents of Astana also lined up at the city's blood centre to donate blood. The Russian Ministry of Emergency Situations flew equipment and medical workers to Kazakhstan to help with the response to the crash. It later airlifted Russian nationals injured in the accident to Moscow. On 26 December, seven injured Azerbaijanis were repatriated by Baku's Ministry of Emergency Situations.

A Republican headquarters was created on the basis of Kazakhstan's Emergencies Ministry Command Centre, which included representatives of the Ministry of Internal Affairs, the Ministry of Healthcare, the Ministry of Transport, the National Guard, the Ministry of Foreign Affairs and other agencies. Meanwhile, President Kassym-Jomart Tokayev issued awards to employees of Astana's Ministry of Emergency Situations, the Mangistau Electric Grid Company and Aktau International Airport as well as health workers and police officers involved in the response to the crash.

A crisis centre was established at the Russian consulate in Oral. Diplomatic staff were also sent to the crash site. Representatives from the Azerbaijani consulate in Aktau were also deployed to the crash site. A special medical team and related equipment were also dispatched from Azerbaijan. On the day of the accident, one of the aircraft's two flight recorders was located by a search team. The second was confirmed to be recovered the next day.

Azerbaijan Airlines suspended its Baku–Grozny–Baku and Baku–Makhachkala–Baku flights for the duration of the investigation. It also opened a hotline for relatives of those on board and changed its social media profiles to black as a sign of mourning. The Israeli flag carrier El Al suspended flights from Tel Aviv to Moscow for a week "citing developments in Russia's airspace". It later extended the suspension until the end of March 2025. On 27 December Azerbaijan Airlines also suspended flights to Sochi, Volgograd, Ufa, Samara, Mineralnye Vody, Nizhny Novgorod, Vladikavkaz and Saratov, citing "security reasons", likely due to the investigation finding anti aircraft missile damage in the aircraft. Qazaq Air also suspended its flights from Astana to Yekaterinburg until 27 January 2025 citing similar concerns. Flydubai also suspended flights to Sochi and Mineralnye Vody for a few days. Turkmenistan Airlines also suspended flights from Ashgabat to Moscow Domodedovo Airport from 30 December until 31 January.

The pilots of the plane and flight attendant Hokuma Aliyeva were buried at the II Alley of Honor. President Ilham Aliyev posthumously awarded them the title of National Hero of Azerbaijan, while the two surviving crew members, Zulfiqar Asadov and Aydan Rahimli, were awarded the Order of "Rashadat" (Courage) of the 1st degree.

== Compensation ==
Azerbaijan Airlines said it would pay 20,000 manats (approximately US$12,000) as compensation to each of the injured passengers, and 40,000 manats (approximately US$23,000) to the families of those who were killed. All surviving passengers will also receive the relevant insurance payment in accordance with Azerbaijani law. On 24 January the Kazakh government said that the families of its nationals who died in the crash would receive 5 million tenges each as compensation.

In February 2025, AlfaStrakhovanie, a Russian insurance company, completed the full payment for the aviation hull insurance of the Embraer E190 aircraft, with a significant portion reinsured by the Russian National Reinsurance Company. While the exact amount remains undisclosed, it is estimated to be between US$25 million and US$30 million. Compensation to passengers, based on the Montreal Convention and Russian law, began in January and continues, with payouts of up to 2 million rubles (around US$22,000) for injury or loss of life.

On 4 September 2025, the Russian Foreign Ministry denied reports of nonpayment by media outlets and bloggers, stating insurer AlfaStrakhovanie JSC has been issuing compensation since February. Payments included ₽1.003 billion (US$12.3 million) to AZAL for the plane and ₽358.4 million (US$4.4 million) to victims and families, covering 46 of 62 passengers: seven Russian, 35 Azerbaijani, three Kyrgyz, and one Kazakh citizens. In response, Azerbaijani Foreign Ministry spokesperson Aykhan Hajizada called the Russian statement misleading, stressing that the payouts were made strictly under AZAL's insurance contract and cannot be equated with the compensation Azerbaijan is demanding from the Russian government over the crash.

On 15 April 2026, the governments of Russia and Azerbaijan reached a compensation agreement.

== Reactions ==
Azerbaijani President Ilham Aliyev was en route to the Commonwealth of Independent States summit in Saint Petersburg, Russia, when news of the accident broke out, leading him to return to Baku, where he held an emergency meeting on the accident shortly after landing at Baku airport. He declared a day of national mourning for 26 December and later expressed thanks for Kazakh officials for their response to the disaster. First lady and vice-president Mehriban Aliyeva also expressed condolences, as did Prime Minister Ali Asadov. Condolences to Azerbaijan were expressed by Kazakh President Kassym-Jomart Tokayev and Russian President Vladimir Putin as well as leaders from countries outside the flight's path.

Amid reports that the aircraft was fired at during a Ukrainian drone attack, Ukrainian president Volodymyr Zelenskyy called for a "thorough investigation", adding that visual evidence at the crash site "points to Russia's responsibility". On 28 December Zelenskyy called Aliyev, expressed condolences and support to Azerbaijan and stated that "Russia must provide clear explanations and stop spreading disinformation". White House spokesperson John Kirby said that the United States had seen "early indications" that Russia may have been responsible for the crash, adding that Washington had offered to assist in the investigation. European Union foreign policy chief Kaja Kallas also said the crash was a "stark reminder" of the shooting down of Malaysia Airlines Flight 17 in 2014 and called for a "swift, independent international investigation".

On 27 December, Dmitry Yadrov, head of Russia's civil aviation authority Rosaviatsia, said that Ukrainian drones attacked Grozny as the plane was about to land in thick fog, prompting authorities to close the area to air traffic.

On 27 December, Azerbaijani media reported that the head of the Chechen Republic, Ramzan Kadyrov attempted to contact president Aliyev privately and offered "financial support" for the victims, which was interpreted as a personal admission of responsibility and an attempt to resolve the case quietly without public apology. This request was denied and negatively received in Baku. A day of mourning was declared for 28 December in Chechnya by order of Kadyrov.

According to the Flight Safety Foundation's Aviation Safety Network, it would be the third major shooting down of a civilian aircraft linked to armed conflict since 2014, along with Malaysia Airlines Flight 17 and Ukraine International Airlines Flight 752. The Wall Street Journal highlighted the risks of civil aviation near war zones, stating that accidental shooting down of civilian aircraft has become the leading cause of deaths in commercial aviation in recent years.

On 28 December, Putin apologised to Aliyev for the "tragic incident involving the aircraft that occurred in Russian airspace", but did not confirm that the flight had been shot down and did not take responsibility. He also added that Ukrainian drones had been targeting Grozny and that Russian air defence systems had been activated to respond to the attack. He said that at the time the cities of Grozny, Mozdok and Vladikavkaz "were attacked by Ukrainian combat drones, and Russian air defence systems repelled these attacks." The Kremlin said Russia had launched a criminal investigation into the incident and would cooperate with Azerbaijani prosecutors.

Azerbaijani commentators summarised their expectations in relation to the disaster, regarding Russia's apology, the prosecution of those responsible, and compensation payments. They noted that, while Putin had offered a vague apology, he never officially responded to the other two requests.

Azerbaijani officials claimed that the pilots were denied permission to conduct an emergency landing at any airport in Russia, forcing them to change course to Aktau, an alleged attempt to hide evidence in the hopes the aircraft would crash into the Caspian Sea.

On 6 January 2025, president Aliyev explicitly blamed "representatives of the Russian Federation" for the crash, clarifying that it was Russian air defence that downed the plane according to preliminary investigation. Aliyev also criticised Russia for not closing its airspace prior to the aircraft's landing and engaging in a cover-up by promoting "absurd versions" instead of simply allowing an emergency landing on nearby airports.

In a safety bulletin issued on 10 January 2025, the European Union Aviation Safety Agency (EASA) cited the downing of Flight 8243 to reiterate warnings about the high risks of civilian flights over Russian airspace—especially west of longitude 60° East—due to active air defense systems and drone attacks. EASA advised operators to avoid this airspace at all flight levels, highlighting Flight 8243 as a clear example of these dangers.

In May 2025, Aliyev cancelled a visit to Moscow to celebrate the Moscow Victory Day Parade as according to the Azerbaijani Press Agency, multiple factors, such as Russia not taking any "operational investigative measures" nor finding or bringing to justice "those who were responsible", cyberattacks on Azerbaijani media supposedly originating from Russia, and the detention and deportation of Azerbaijani member of parliament Azer Badamov over "repeated anti-Russian and Russophobic statements", were said to have influenced his decision.

On 1 July 2025, the Azerbaijani website Minval Politika reported that it had received an anonymous letter containing materials related to the downing of Flight 8243. According to the publication, the materials included a statement attributed to the commander of a Russian air defence battery, along with video and audio recordings. In the statement, the officer described communication problems and dense fog that hindered visual identification of the aircraft. He stated that, despite these conditions, he received and followed an order to fire from the Russian Ministry of Defence, launching two missiles, one of which damaged the aircraft.

On 2 July 2025, Ukrainska Pravda published an unsigned handwritten letter with a purported explanatory note from an air defence system commander, Captain Dmitry Paladychuk, claiming that the aircraft was engaged under orders from the Russian Ministry of Defence.

On 19 July 2025, Aliyev announced Azerbaijan's intention to file an international lawsuit against Russia regarding the downing of Flight 8243. Aliyev criticized Russia for failing to provide clear answers in the seven months since the incident and demanded formal responsibility, accountability, and full compensation for the victims and their families. Azerbaijani prosecutors made several requests to Russia's Investigative Committee but received no conclusive responses beyond ongoing investigations.

On 9 October 2025, Putin stated that a Russian air defense rocket had hit the aircraft. He suggested that the rocket did not directly hit the aircraft because if it did, it would have crashed immediately. He also told Aliyev that Azerbaijan would be compensated for the crash and that he would ensure an "objective assessment".

=== Memorials ===
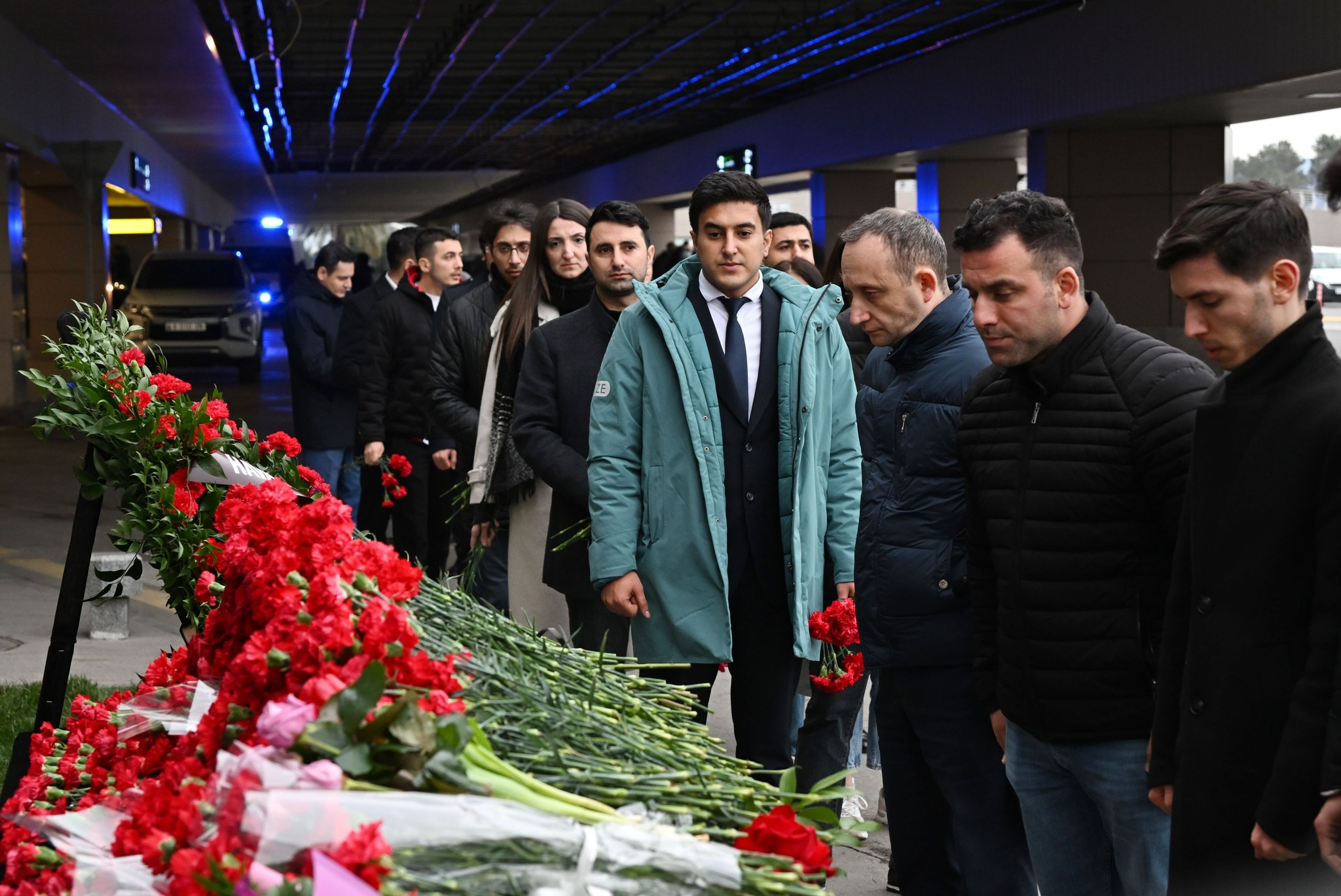
Commemoration of the flight at Heydar Aliyev Airport in Baku, Azerbaijan, 26 December 2024

Following the crash of Flight 8243, the Azerbaijani government declared a national day of mourning on 26 December 2024. A moment of silence was observed nationwide at noon. Several sporting events, including matches in the eighth round of the Azerbaijan Futsal Premier League and the Azerbaijan National Futsal Cup, commenced with a one-minute silence. Additionally, the Azerbaijan Taekwondo and Wrestling Championships, as well as cultural and public events scheduled in theaters and concert venues, were postponed in observance of the mourning period.

A memorial stand was installed at the southern entrance of Terminal 2 at Heydar Aliyev International Airport in Baku. The installation featured photographs of the 38 victims and floral tributes.

In Aktau, Kazakhstan, flowers were laid at the General Consulate of Azerbaijan, and posters were placed on the consulate's walls in memory of the victims. In Astana, floral tributes were also placed at the Azerbaijani embassy as a gesture of condolence.

On 7 February 2025, a memorial service was held in Azerbaijan to honor the crash victims. Organized by the Kazakh Embassy and Mangistau Regional Akimat, it was attended by officials, victims' families, rescue workers, and locals. Azerbaijani businessman Amil Yusifov donated furnished apartments to families and vehicles to emergency services.

On 14 April 2025, Azerbaijani mountaineers unveiled a memorial plaque at the "Khinalig and Koch Yolu" State Historical-Cultural and Ethnographic Reserve to honor the 38 victims, including three crew members, of the crash.

On 24 May 2025, local residents of Tupkaragan District established a memorial near the crash site outside Aktau International Airport, consisting of a fenced area with benches and floral tributes for public remembrance, which received approval from local authorities. Subsequently, on 26 June 2025, a formal monument was officially erected to honor the crew members of Flight 8243, with particular recognition given to Captain Igor Kshnyakin and Senior Flight Attendant Hokuma Aliyeva.

== Investigation ==
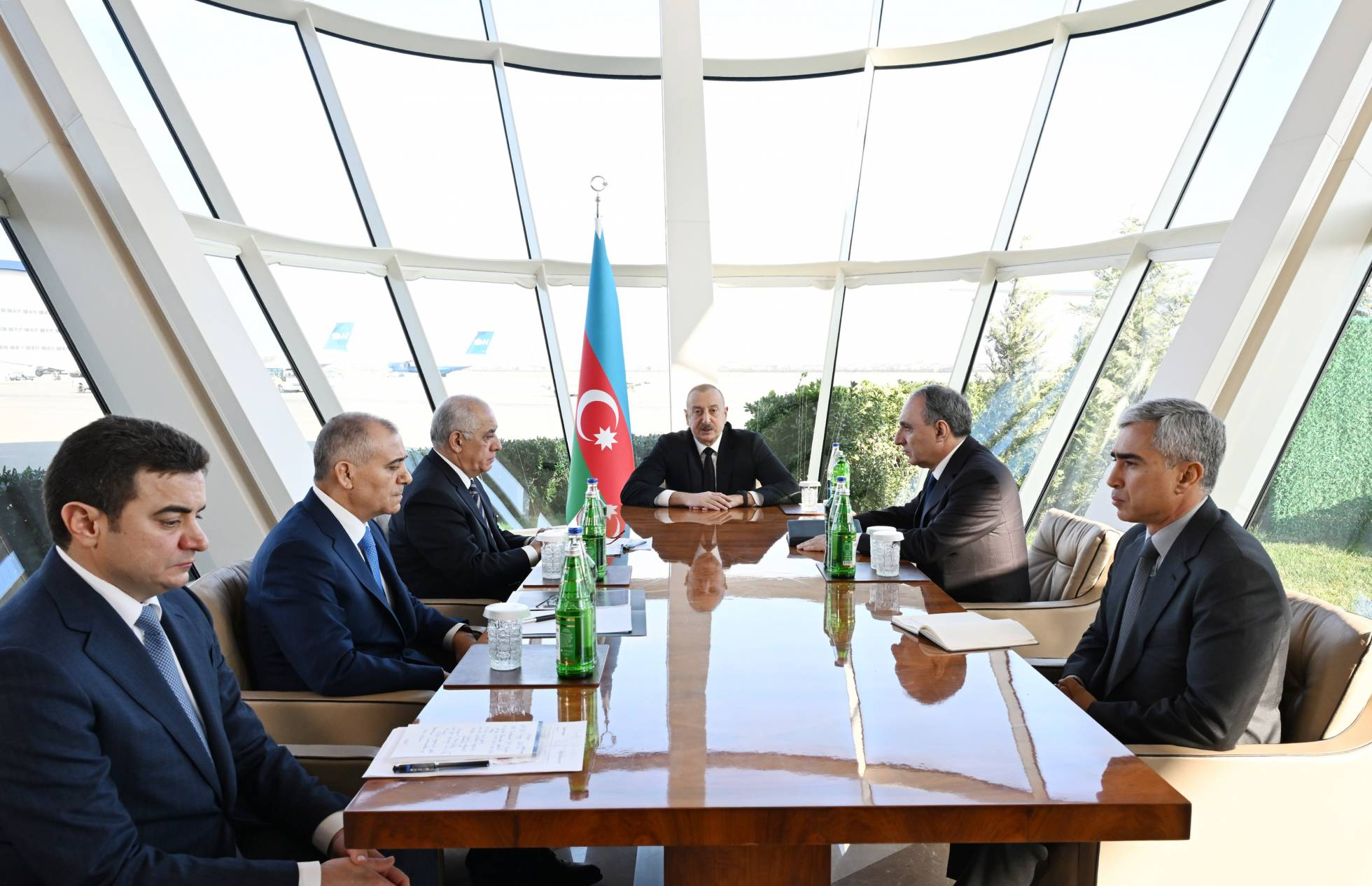
Azerbaijani President Ilham Aliyev in a cabinet meeting in connection with the plane crash, 25 December 2024

Both Azerbaijan and Kazakhstan opened commissions to investigate the disaster. The Kazakh commission was headed by deputy prime minister Qanat Bozymbaev, while Kazakh emergencies minister Chingis Arinov also visited Aktau. The Azerbaijani commission was headed by Prime Minister Ali Asadov. Azerbaijan sent a delegation consisting of its emergency situations minister, deputy general prosecutor, and the vice-president of Azerbaijan Airlines to Aktau to conduct an on-site investigation. It also invited a group of civil aviation experts from Turkey for assistance. Embraer said it would assist in the investigation. It along with the Brazilian air incident investigation agency CENIPA sent representatives to Kazakhstan. Kazakh authorities have reportedly sent the FDR and CVR to Brazil, where they would be examined by CENIPA. Russia also opened an investigation initially headed by the Western Inter-regional Investigation Department for Transport and later the Investigative Committee.

On 26 December Kazakhstan said that law enforcement officials from Russia and Azerbaijan were not allowed to participate in the forensic investigation, citing existing laws. On 27 December, Azerbaijan rejected a proposal by Russia and Kazakhstan to have the accident investigated by the Interstate Aviation Committee of the Commonwealth of Independent States, saying that it wanted the investigation to be conducted by international experts and Embraer specialists. President Ilham Aliyev cited issues of objectivity caused by the predominance of Russian officials in the committee as a reason for the refusal.

In the initial aftermath, Azerbaijan Airlines stated that bird strikes could have caused the plane to crash, with Azerbaijan Airlines President Samir Rzayev, speaking to journalists, ruling out a technical failure as a potential cause. Russia's Federal Air Transport Agency suggested that based on preliminary information, the request for emergency landing was due to a bird strike.

The bird strike hypothesis was soon questioned, as images from the scene showed significant perforations on the tail surfaces. Survivors of the crash reported hearing an explosion followed by shrapnel hitting the plane and some passengers. The crew had reported a strong impact on the fuselage from what was initially assumed to have been birds. Multiple experts from multiple countries stated that the damage in the images were not consistent with a bird strike, and that birds do not fly at the altitude that the plane was flying when the initial damage occurred.

On 26 December Azerbaijani government sources stated that a Russian Pantsir-S1 had fired a missile at the aircraft above Grozny, detonating near the plane, injuring passengers and crew members. Despite the pilots' requests to perform an emergency landing, they were reportedly denied to do so at the airports of Makhachkala and Mineralnye Vody, instead being redirected to Aktau. Analysis by the Azerbaijani Press Agency indicated that the missile exploded at an altitude of 2,400 metres (7,900 ft) over Naursky District, 18 kilometres (11 mi) north-northwest of Grozny airport. According to Russian sources, as Flight 8243 flew over Chechen airspace, Russian air defence forces were actively engaging Ukrainian drones. On the morning of 25 December, the head of the Security Council of the Chechen Republic, Khamzat Kadyrov, confirmed that Grozny had been attacked by drones. He stated that there were no casualties or damage resulting from the accident.

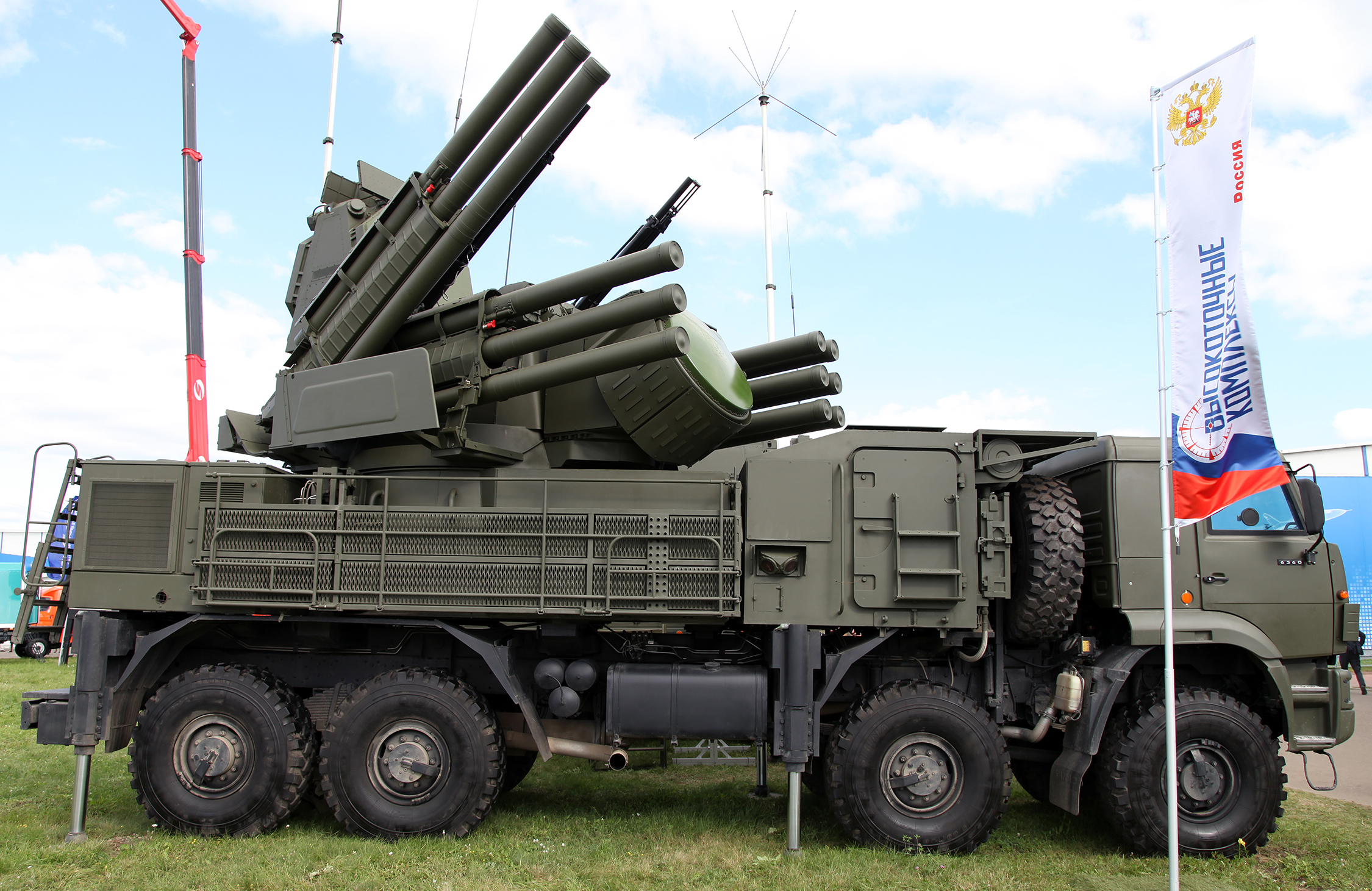
Pantsir missile launcher

Four sources in Azerbaijan with knowledge of the investigation informed Reuters that the aeroplane was downed by a Russian air defence system. According to one of the sources, preliminary investigation showed that the plane was hit by a Russian Pantsir-S air defence system, and its communication systems were jammed by electronic warfare systems when approaching Grozny. In response, Azerbaijani MP Rasim Musabeyov demanded from Russia an official apology and bringing to justice those responsible, adding that otherwise "relations will be affected".

In the article published in The Times on 27 December, an American pilot and two French experts analysed the post-crash video, and stated that the plane was probably hit by a missile. The article stated that after losing all flight control systems, the pilots attempted to make an emergency landing. Experts reported that videos taken before and after the crash indicate that shrapnel pierced the rear of the aircraft, disabling all three parallel hydraulic systems located in the wings and tail section. When the control systems failed, the crew likely tried to manage the aircraft's pitch and roll angles by independently adjusting the thrust power of the two engines.

On 27 December the Azerbaijani minister of digital development and transportation Rashad Nabiyev said that preliminary results showed that Flight 8243 crashed due to "physical and technical external interference" from an unspecified weapon.

That same day Rosaviatsia declared that a closed-skies protocol called the "Carpet" (Russian: Ковер, romanized: Kovyor) plan had been imposed in Grozny on the day of the crash, citing the presence of Ukrainian drones.

On 29 December President Aliyev said that the aircraft was shot down by Russia unintentionally and criticised Moscow for trying to "hush up" the incident and initially releasing "delirious versions" of what happened. He also acknowledged Putin's apology over the disaster, while demanding that Russia admit responsibility, punish those culpable and pay compensation to Azerbaijan and the victims. The next day, the Azerbaijani General Prosecutor said that he was told by the head of Russia's Investigative Committee that "intensive measures are being carried out to identify the guilty people and bring them to criminal responsibility".

On 24 January 2025, Azerbaijani media reported that the results of an investigation conducted in Russia confirmed that the aircraft had been shot down by the Pantsir S-1 Air Defense system. The investigation determined that electronic warfare had been used against the aircraft, and that Russia identified both the individuals who fired at the aircraft and those who gave the orders.

As of May 2025, the investigation of the Azerbaijan Airlines Flight 8243 crash had proceeded to its second stage, concentrating on the thorough examination of all collected materials. Kazakhstan's Minister of Transport, Marat Qarabaev, reported that specialists, including international experts from the International Civil Aviation Organization (ICAO), conducted visits to key locations in Baku, Grozny, and Rostov-on-Don. All necessary documentation and evidence are now held within Kazakhstan.

=== Kazakh investigation reports ===
==== Preliminary report ====
On 4 February 2025, a preliminary report issued by the Ministry of Transport of the Republic of Kazakhstan (MT RK) stated that Azerbaijan Airlines Flight 8243 likely crashed due to the penetration of “external objects” into the aircraft's structure. The report detailed extensive damage to the fuselage and vertical stabilizer, including multiple puncture and perforation marks consistent with high-velocity fragments. This structural damage caused a catastrophic failure of the aircraft's hydraulic systems, resulting in a total loss of hydraulic fluid and pressure. Consequently, the flight control systems became inoperable, leading to a complete loss of control by the flight crew. The report also noted that the damage pattern was inconsistent with a bird strike or internal mechanical failure and suggested the external objects were likely fragments from an explosive device.

Azerbaijani officials confirmed the discovery of Pantsir S-1 missile fragments inside the wreckage, citing the preliminary report as reinforcing evidence that the aircraft was struck by an external force prior to crashing.

== See also ==
- Attacks in Russia during the Russian invasion of Ukraine
- Flight with disabled controls
- List of airliner shootdown incidents
