= Aleksandr Kalyaninov =

Azerbaijani pilot (1992–2024)

- Born: 11 December 1992; Baku, Azerbaijan
- Died: 25 December 2024 (aged 32); Aktau, Kazakhstan
- Cause of death: Aircraft accident
- Resting place: II Alley of Honor, Baku, Azerbaijan
- Occupation: Pilot

Aleksandr Georgievich Kalyaninov (Azerbaijani: Aleksandr Georgiyeviç Kalyaninov; 11 December 1992 – 25 December 2024) was an Azerbaijani commercial airline pilot who was recognized as a National Hero of Azerbaijan.

== Early life ==
Aleksandr Kalyaninov was born in 1992 in Baku, Azerbaijan. He graduated from the Baku European Lyceum. In 2021, he earned a master's degree in Aviation Transport from the National Aviation University of Ukraine.

== Death ==
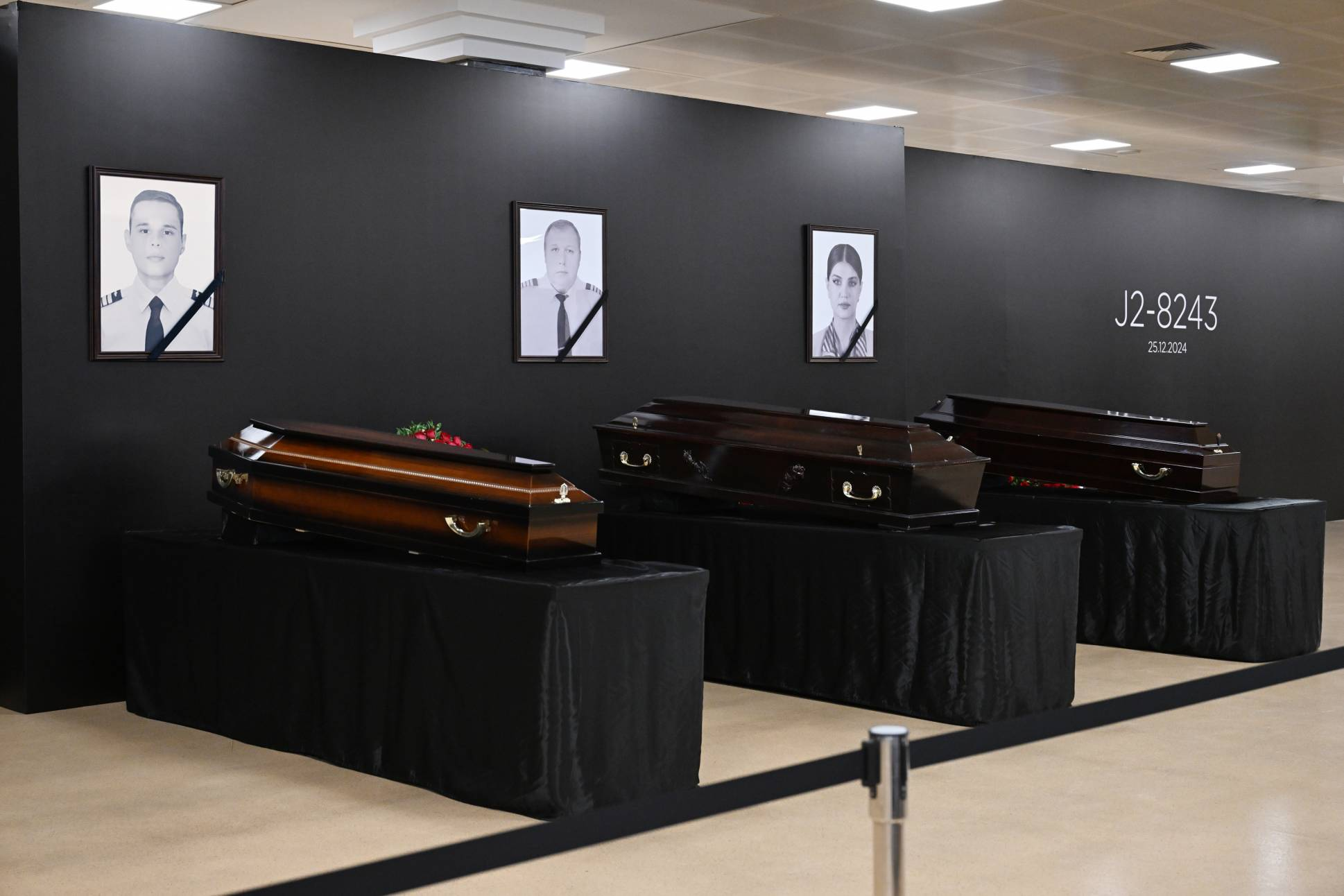
The farewell ceremony for the deceased crew members of Flight 8243, Heydar Aliyev International Airport (Kalyaninov's coffin is on the left)

On 25 December 2024, Azerbaijan Airlines Flight 8243, an Embraer 190 aircraft, was struck by a Russian Pantsir-S1 anti-aircraft missile system. Despite the failure of control systems, the aircraft's captain Igor Kshnyakin and co-pilot Kalyaninov steered the aircraft, over the Caspian Sea, towards an area near Aktau International Airport. During the emergency landing near Aktau, Kazakhstan, the plane crashed into the ground.

The aircraft was carrying 67 people: 62 passengers and 5 crew members. Twenty-nine individuals survived the crash, Kalyaninov died in the crash. He was buried on 29 December 2024, at the II Alley of Honor.

== Awards and legacy ==
On 29 December 2024, by the decree of the President of the Republic of Azerbaijan, Aleksandr Kalyaninov was posthumously awarded the title of "National Hero of Azerbaijan".

The memory of Kshnyakin and his crew was commemorated by the Azerbaijani government and Azerbaijan Airlines through special memorial events. His action is scheduled to be featured in the Azerbaijan Aviation Museum and other international aviation institutions.

== See also ==
- Hokuma Aliyeva, flight attendant who died in the same accident
