= Danda Venkata Subba Reddy =

Indian doctor

Danda Venkata Subba Reddy (1899–1987) was a professor of medicine in India, and a pioneer of the medical history of South Asia. Subba Reddy was the founder of the National Institute of Indian Medical Heritage in Hyderabad, an institution first envisioned by Henry Sigerist in the 1940s.

He was principal of Gandhi Medical College, Hyderabad between 4 May 1957 and 29 January 1959.

He wrote many pioneering articles on Indian medical history, and the book Glimpses Of Health And Medicine In Mauryan Empire (1966).

== Publications ==
- Byron's Don Juan : A Study. by Byron, George Gordon, Subba Reddy, D. V. Norwood Editions, 1976
- A classification for the old medical books and medical historical collections in Indian libraries by Subba Reddy, D. V. Director-General of Health Services, 1947
- Western epitomes of Indian medicine. by Subba Reddy, D. V. Upgraded Dept. of History of Medicine, Osmania Medical College, 1966
- Wilhem Ten Rhyne (Rhijne) and his Treatise on Asiatic Leprosy; a medical classic by a Dutch physician in Java in the last quarter of 17th century. Subba Reddy D.V. Bull Indian Inst Hist Med Hyderabad. 1975 July ;5 (3):150-61.
- A rare Sanskrit medical manuscript of early period of Vijayanagar kingdom. Vaidyavallabha by Lakshmana Pandita, Pranacharya of King Bukka II (1404-1406 AD.). Subba Reddy D.V., B Rama Rao. Bull Inst Hist Med Hyderabad. 1972 January ;2 (2):61-4.
- Glimpses of medicine in Rajatarangini; diseases, drugs, physicians and treatments in medieval Kashmir. Subba Reddy D.V., Bull Inst Hist Med Hyderabad. 1973 October ;3 (4):189-200
- History of Siddha medicine; need for further detailed studies. Subba Reddy D.V. Bull Inst Hist Med Hyderabad. 1973 October ;3 (4):182-5
- Buddha's discourses on medicament treatment and nursing. Subba Reddy D.V. Bull Indian Inst Hist Med Hyderabad. 1984 ;14 (1-4):19-31
- Prelude to upgraded Department of History of Medicine, Hyderabad. Subba Reddy D.V. Bull Indian Inst Hist Med Hyderabad. 1982 ;12 (1-4):92-9
- Major General S. L. Bhatia (1891–1982). Subba Reddy D.V. Bull Indian Inst Hist Med Hyderabad. 1982 ;12 (1-4):88-91
- Prof. Jean Filliozat (1906–1981). Subba Reddy D.V. Bull Indian Inst Hist Med Hyderabad. 1982 ;12 (1-4):85-8
- Dr. Mahendra Lal Sircar. The first eminent allopath to practise and propagate homoeopathy. Subba Reddy D.V. Bull Indian Inst Hist Med Hyderabad. 1974 January ;4 (1):32-47
- Medical Ethics in Ancient India, Subba Reddy D.V. Indian Journal of Dermatology, Venereology and Leprology, 1961: 27 (6): 198—199
