= St. Ann's High School, Secunderabad =

St. Ann's High School
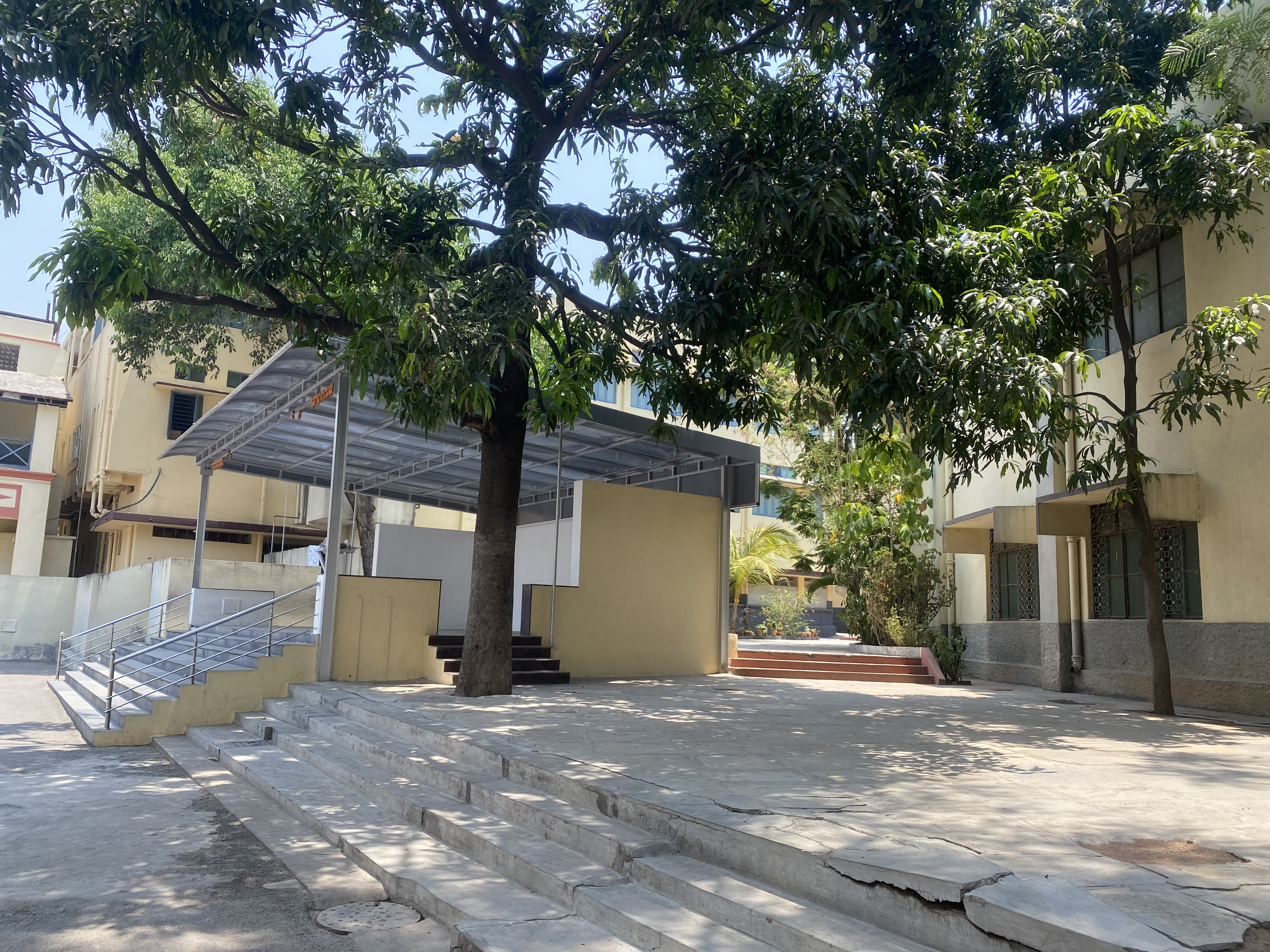
- A small stage inside St. Ann's High School

Location
- SD Road; Secunderabad, Telangana, 500003; India; 17.4456432°N 78.4902118°E

Information
- Type: Private school
- Motto: Latin: Sicut apis Operosa (As busy as bees)
- Religious affiliation: Roman Catholic
- Established: 1 April 1871; 155 years ago
- School board: Council for the Indian School Certificate Examinations
- Principal: Sr. Antonia
- Grades: I–XII
- Gender: Girls
- Colours: Navy Blue and White
- Website: www.stannsisc.com

St. Ann's High School is a private, Roman Catholic school for girls in Secunderabad, Telangana, India. It was established on 1 April 1871 and is affiliated to the ICSE/ISC board, Council for the Indian School Certificate Examinations.

== Notable alumni ==
- Diana Hayden, Miss World 1997, actress and model
- Ananda Shankar Jayant, classical dancer, choreographer, scholar and bureaucrat
- Jayathi Murthy, dean of the UCLA Henry Samueli School of Engineering and Applied Science
- Smita Sabharwal, IAS officer
- Sushmita Sen, Miss Universe 1994, actress and model
- Rakesh Sharma, First Indian Astronaut in space.
- Shantha Sinha, activist
- Tania Soni, beauty pageant titleholder
- Tabu, actress
