= Gandhi Medical College and Hospital =

Medical college in Hyderabad, India

Coordinates: 17°25′28.46″N 78°30′15.82″E

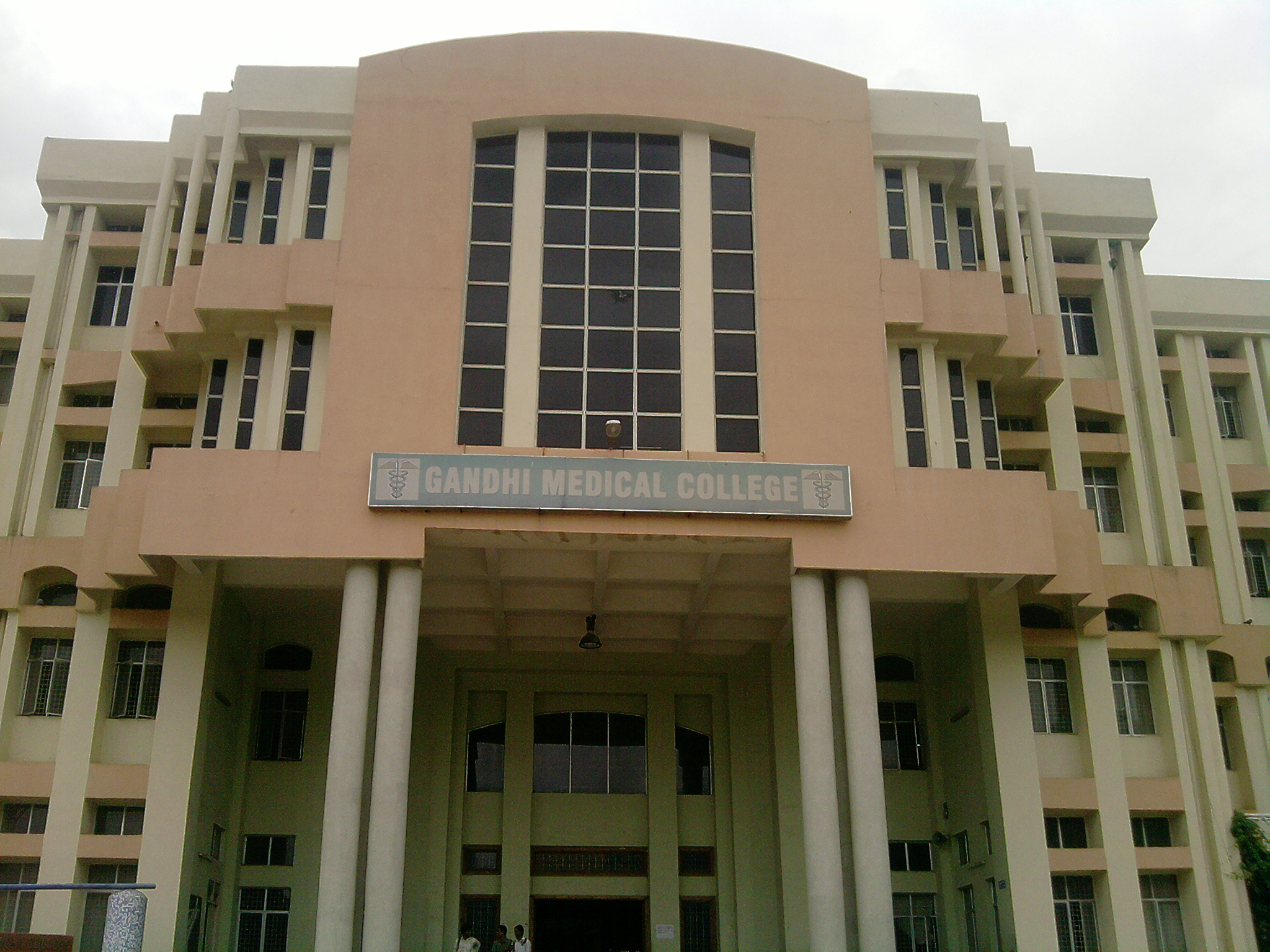
- Motto: Thamasoma jyothirgamaya
- Type: Public medical college
- Established: 1954; 72 years ago
- Affiliations: Kaloji Narayana Rao University of Health Sciences, NMC
- Principal: Dr. K. Indira
- Location: Secunderabad, Telangana, India
- Website: gmcsecunderabad.org

Gandhi Medical College and Hospital (GMC) is a public medical college in Secunderabad, India. It is affiliated with Kaloji Narayana Rao University of Health Sciences. The college was originally affiliated to NTR University of Health Sciences.

== History ==
=== Gandhi Hospital ===
The old Gandhi Hospital building near Secunderabad railway station

Gandhi hospital which was earlier known as King Edward Memorial Hospital was established in 1851 as in infirmary with three wards for the benefit of British residents in Secunderabad. It was converted to a cantonment level hospital with 95 beds in 1900 and was established as a proper Hospital as King Edward Memorial Hospital in 1913. The hospital located adjacent to Secunderabad railway station and Monda Market was renamed as Gandhi Hospital in 1958. Also in 1958, the hospital was declared as a teaching hospital for Gandhi Medical college which had been just shifted to Basheerbagh from Humayun Nagar. In 2003 the hospital was shifted to its new venue at Musheerabad after the jail which had earlier occupied the area was demolished.

=== Gandhi Medical College ===
Gandhi Medical College, originally named People's Medical College, was founded on 14 September 1954. It was located at Humayun nagar close to the present-day Sarojini Devi Eye Hospital. It was opened because the original medical college in the area, Osmania Medical College, was unable to keep up with the demands for physicians in the State. Dr. Syed Nizamuddin Ahmed was the first principal and the founder of the college.

Named after Mahatma Gandhi, it was inaugurated on 25 June 1955 by the first president of India, Rajendra Prasad.

By 1956, the college was in financial trouble, and the government of Hyderabad agreed to take it over and develop it.

In 1958, the college was moved to Basheerbagh. The old building has since been demolished. In 2003, the college moved to its new premises in Musheerabad. The new facility, along with a hospital, was constructed on the area that formerly housed the Musheerabad Jail.

Initially the teaching hospital for the college was an infirmary that opened in 1851 with funds from philanthropists, and was named KEM Hospital in honor of King Edward VII. The hospital was renamed Gandhi Hospital in 1958. At that time nearly all the heads of units were British trained.

From 1954 to 2003, a total of 6090 students were admitted to the MBBS course. The number of students admitted ranged between a minimum of 42 in 1954 to a maximum of 224 in 1968. In 1970, there were no admissions.

In the late 1950s and 1960s, the college and hospital were consolidated.

In the 1970s there was a growth in so-called "super specialties" such as cardiology, cardio-thoracic surgery, neurology and neurosurgery.

== Academics ==
Courses offered by the institute include:

- Bachelor of Medicine and Surgery (MBBS)
- Bachelors in Physical Therapy (BPT)
- Doctor of Medicine/Master of Surgery (MD/MS)
- Doctor of Medicine/MCh
- Bachelor of Science (BSc) courses in nursing, paramedical and medical specialities

250 students per year are admitted to study for MBBS degrees. There are also 241 postgraduate students admitted per year, including those in clinical, non-clinical and super specialty subjects. Students can earn one of 37 degrees in various branches of medicine. Since 2013 the number of undergraduate seats has been increased from 150 to 200.

Departments of the college include anatomy, physiology, biochemistry, forensic medicine, microbiology, pathology, pharmacology and community medicine. The college plays host to several academic and cultural events throughout the year, such as medical conferences, workshops and quizzes. Some of these include Gandhi Orthopaedic Education (GOE) and AEGIS.

The final-year students of the college also publish an annual college magazine, which is a collection of articles, photographs, artwork and other content created by the professors and students of the college.

== Hospital departments ==
The GMH is a 1,200-bed facility and each year performs about 80,000 outpatient consultations, 42,000 inpatient admissions, 15,000 minor operations, and 11,000 major operations.

The hospital is divided into 27 departments:

- General Medicine
- General Surgery
- Pediatrics
- Orthopedics
- Anesthesia
- Dermatology
- Leprosy
- Sexually Transmitted Disease
- Ophthalmology
- E.N.T. & Head and Neck Surgery
- Radiodiagnosis
- Casualty
- Blood Bank
- Cardiology
- Neurology
- Nephrology
- Gastroenterology
- Endocrinology
- Cardiothoracic surgery
- Neurosurgery
- Pediatric Surgery
- Plastic Surgery
- Urology
- TB Clinic
- Dental
- OB/GYN
- Psychiatry
- Hospital Administration

== Principals ==
- Dr. Syed Nizamuddin Ahmed (founder and first principal): 1 May 1954 – 1 July 1956
- Dr. Bankat Chandra: 2 July 1956 – 3 May 1957
- Dr. D. V. Subba Reddy: 4 May 1957 – 29 January 1959
- Dr. G.C.S. Naidu: 30 January 1959 – 21 December 1959
- Dr. Mohammad Yousufuddin Ansari: 22 December 1959 – 28 March 1963
- Dr. B.S. Surt: 28 March 1963 – 15 June 1967
- Dr. G.P. Ramayya: 29 August 1967 – 28 May 1968
- Dr. G. Narshing Rao: 1970 – 1974
- Dr. S. Ramchander Rao: 1976 – 1976
- Dr. Kameshwari Devi: 1977 – 1977
- Dr. Y. Jaya: 1974 – 1978
- Dr. Sanku. Ramchander Rao: 1976 – 1976
- Dr. U. Brahmaji Rao: 1 March 1983 – 24 May 1983
- Dr. C. Shyamala Bhaskaran: 24 May 1983 – 30 October 1990
- Dr. Lily N. Ebenezer: 31 October 1990 – 8 August 1991
- Dr. G. Shyam Sunder: 7 August 1991 – 3 September 1993
- Dr. V.V. Satyanarayana: 31 March 1994 – 6 May 1994
- Dr. B.C. Mathur: 5 September 1994 – 31 July 1995
- Dr. T.E. Kasturi: 1 August 1995 – 30 September 1996
- Dr. K. Shantha Kumari : 1 January 1997 – 31 May 1998
- Dr. K. Gopal Singh: 29 June 1998 – 3 September 1998
- Dr. Farhatunnisa: 4 September 1998 – 31 January 1999
- Dr. P. Vijaya Lakshmi: 31 March 1999 – 30 September 1999
- Dr. P. Shyam Sunder: 2 April 2000 – 30 July 2000
- Dr. Neena Devi: 1 August 2000 – 31 January 2001
- Dr. K. Prameela Devi: 4 March 2001 – 31 August 2001
- Dr. T.S.S. Lakshmi: 4 September 2001 – 16 November 2001
- Dr. Meenakshi: 16 November 2001 – 31 December 2002
- Dr. C.A. Aruna: 1 October 2003 – 23 November 2003
- Dr. K.V. Raghava Rao: 28 November 2003 – 30 April 2004
- Dr. Kishore Roy
- Dr. Sikander Hayath
- Dr. Sudha Ramana
- Dr. A.Y.Chary
- Dr. Aravind Kumar
- Dr. Pradeep Deshpande
- Dr. Sidirala Narasimha Rao
- Dr. K.Venkatesh
- Dr. Badeti Srinivasa Rao
- Dr. Ashok Kumar
- Dr. Sreelatha
- Dr. B. S. V. Manjula
- Dr. O. Shravan Kumar
- Dr.Ramesh Reddy
- Dr. Indira (current)

== Gandhi Medical College Global Alliance ==
In 2005 alumni of GMC living in the United States founded the non-profit corporation Gandhi Medical College Global Alliance (GMCGA). This organization's goals are both educational and charitable, with a strong emphasis on fostering kinship among alumni living in other countries.

The accomplishments of GMCGA (sometimes in collaboration with the GMC Alumni Association back in Hyderabad) include construction of an alumni education center, providing study facilities, establishing an American Heart Association accredited cardiac life support training center, setting up electronic library services, donating needed equipment, youth volunteer programs, a free meal program for patient attendants in a shelter associated with Gandhi Hospital, support of the palliative care program in collaboration with Roshni organization, and assisting both medical students and faculty by providing student scholarships, gold medals, and teacher recognition awards.

== Alumni ==
- Sailakshmi Balijepally, surgeon and charity founder
