= Musheerabad Jail =

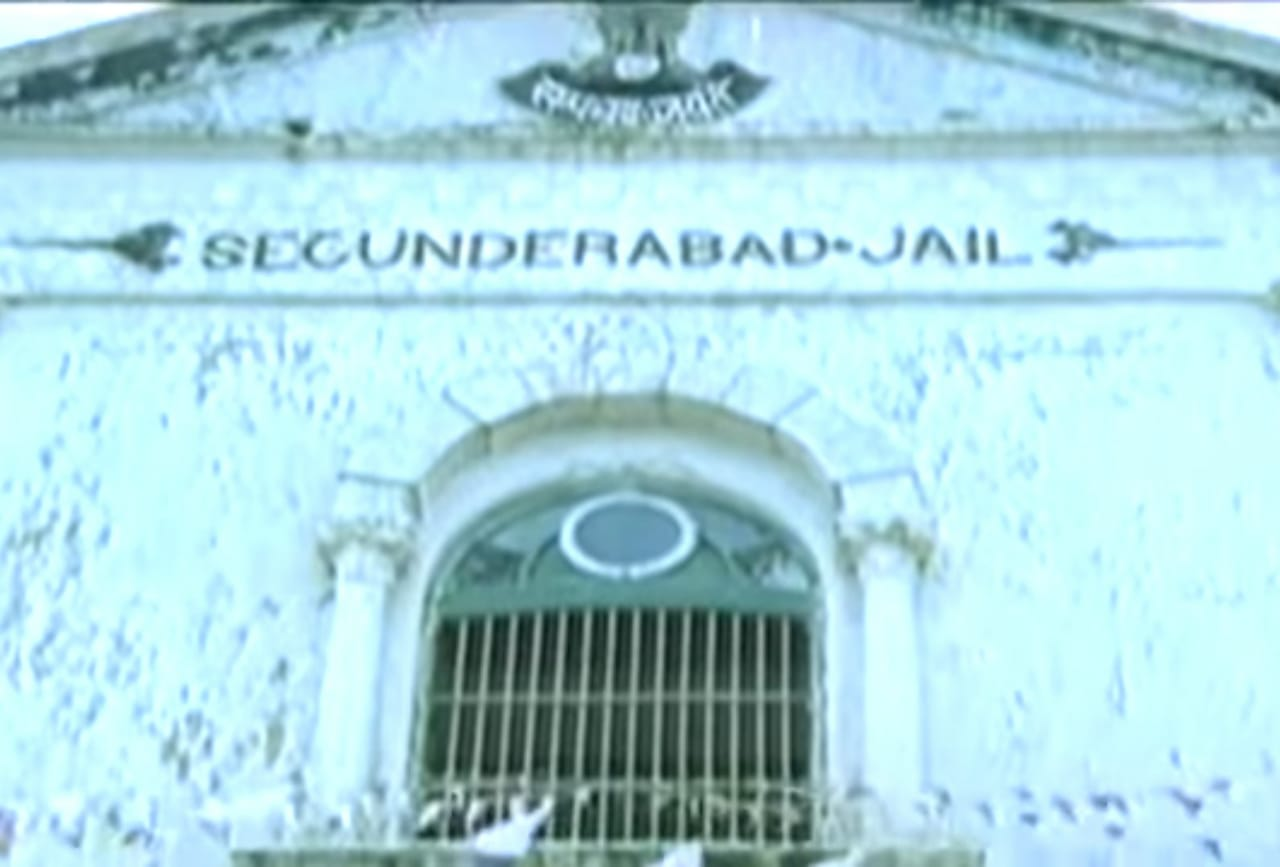
- Interactive map of Musheerabad Jail
- Location: Hyderabad, India; 17.424377°N 78.503795°E
- Status: Defunct
- Opened: 1915 (111 years ago)
- Closed: 2003; 23 years ago
- Managed by: Director General & Inspector General of Prisons and Correctional Services, Government of Andhra Pradesh

Musheerabad Jail was a correctional facility located in Musheerabad area of Hyderabad, India. The facility was demolished in 2003 and the entire area once occupied by the jail now houses the new building of Gandhi hospital which was previously located at Secunderabad. Gandhi Medical college was also shifted to this location. The jail was built during the Nizam era to house prisoners from adjacent areas. The oldest structures in the jail were built in 1876. The construction of the prison had been completed in 1915. All the male prisoners were shifted to Cherlapally and female prisoners were shifted to a separate facility.

Prior to its demolition, film director Nagesh Kukunoor obtained a stay order in order to complete filming of 3 Deewarein (2003).
