= Hokuma Sultanova =

Azerbaijani public and political figure

Deputy Chairman of the Council of Ministers of the Azerbaijan SSR
- In office 8 May 1954 – 30 August 1958

Head of the Fine Arts Administration under the Council of Ministers of the Azerbaijan SSR
- In office 18 November 1947 – 18 August 1951

Personal details
- Born: 1909 Baku, Baku Governorate, Russian Empire
- Died: November 10, 1981 (aged 71–72) Baku, Azerbaijan SSR, Soviet Union
- Resting place: II Alley of Honor
- Party: CPSU
- Awards: Order of the Red Banner of Labour Order of the Badge of Honour

Hokuma Ismail gizi Sultanova (Azerbaijani: Hökumə İsmayıl qızı Sultanova; 1909 in Baku – November 1981 in Baku) was an Azerbaijani public and political figure, Deputy Chairman of the Council of Ministers of the Azerbaijan SSR (1954–1958), head of the Fine Arts Administration under the Council of Ministers of the Azerbaijan SSR (1947–1951) and leader of the Azerbaijan Women's Council. She is one of the first scholars in Azerbaijani historiography who prepared and published scholarly biographies on Azerbaijani female revolutionaries, party, and state officials regarding their public and political activities.

== Early life and family ==
Hokuma Sultanova was born in 1909 in the town of Black City, near Baku, into a working-class family. After her father's death, she was raised under the guardianship of her elder brother, Gasim Ismailov. She was also the sister of Agha Sultanov, who was the secretary of the Central Committee of the Communist Party of Azerbaijan, and Yagub Sultanov, one of Azerbaijan's first aviators.

== Career ==
Following the Sovietization of Azerbaijan, she attended primary and secondary schools, engaged in public activities, and joined the ranks of the Leninist Young Communist League in 1924. From 1928 to 1932, Sultanova worked as a department head at the Central Committee of the Azerbaijan Lenin Communist Youth Union, later becoming its secretary. In 1930, she became a member of the Communist Party of the Soviet Union (CPSU). In 1936, she graduated from the Institute of Marxism–Leninism. Subsequently, she advanced to the position of deputy director of the cultural and educational department of the Central Committee of the Communist Party of Azerbaijan, and later became its director. She also served as a group leader in the Council of People's Commissars of Azerbaijan SSR.

Hokuma Sultanova was arrested on July 23, 1938, based on the orders of the Special Advisory Council of the People's Commissariat of Internal Affairs (NKVD) of the USSR, on charges of involvement with counter-revolutionary-nationalist organizations. On August 9, 1939, her case was reviewed, and she was released due to lack of evidence and absence of criminal elements in her actions, according to the order dated December 28, 1939, by the Special Advisory Council of the NKVD of the USSR.

In subsequent years, Sultanova was active in the field of journalism, serving as the editor of "Hujum" and "Sharg gadini" magazines. From 1941 to 1947, she worked as the director of the Azerbaijan State Publishing House. From 1947 to 1951, she served as the head of the Fine Arts Administration under the Council of Ministers of the Azerbaijan SSR, and from 1952 to 1954, she was the head of the Azerbaijan SSR Main Press (Lithography) Administration under the Council of Ministers of the Azerbaijan SSR. From 1954 onwards, she worked as the deputy chairman of the Council of Ministers (the first Azerbaijani woman to hold this position).

From 1960 until the end of her life, Hokuma Sultanova worked at the Party History Institute of the Central Committee of the Communist Party of Azerbaijan, and also served as the leader of the Azerbaijan Women's Council. During this time, she researched issues related to the Communist Party of Azerbaijan and the women's movement in Azerbaijan, and she published a number of scholarly works on these topics. Additionally, she engaged in organizational activities, leading the Azerbaijan Women's Council alongside the Central Committee of the Communist Party of Azerbaijan and serving as a member of the editorial board of "Azərbaycan qadını" magazine. Sultanova authored several books, including "40 spring," "Happy women of Soviet Azerbaijan," "Ayna Sultanova," "Seadat," and "Jeyran Bayramova". However, her work "Three sisters" remained unpublished due to her death.

Hokuma Sultanova also worked as an educator; for many years, she served as a professor at Azerbaijan State Pedagogical University, Azerbaijan Oil Academy, and Academy of Public Administration.

Sultanova was repeatedly elected as a member of the Central and Baku Committees of the Communist Party of Azerbaijan, and she also served as a deputy of the Baku Soviet. She was elected as a deputy of the Supreme Soviet of Azerbaijan during its 3rd and 4th convocations. She was honored with the Red Banner of Labor and the Order of the Badge of Honour, and was recognized with the title "Honored Cultural Worker of the Azerbaijan SSR."

Hokuma Sultanova died in November 1981.
