= Smita Sabharwal =

Indian civil servant officer (born 1977)

Member Secretary of Telangana State Finance Commission
- Incumbent
- Assumed office 28 April 2025
- In office 4 January 2024 – 10 November 2024

Secretary to Government Youth Advancement, Tourism & Culture
- In office 11 November 2024 – 27 April 2025

Personal details
- Born: 19 June 1977 (age 49)
- Spouse(s): Akun Sabharwal, IPS (m. 2004)
- Children: Nanak Sabharwal, Bhuvis Sabharwal
- Parents: Colonel Pranab Das (father); Purabi Banerjee (mother)
- Occupation: Bureaucrat

Smita Sabharwal (born 19 June 1977) is an Indian Administrative Service officer of 2001 batch belonging to Telangana cadre. She is popularly known as The People’s Officer for addressing citizen issues by involving people. She is the first lady IAS Officer to be appointed to the Chief Minister's Office. She worked as Member Secretary of Telangana State Finance Commission, Government of Telangana from 4 Jan 2024 to 10 November 2024.

Smita Sabharwal worked as Secretary to Government Youth Advancement, Tourism & Culture from 11 November 2024 to 27 April 2025.

Smita Sabharwal was appointed as Member Secretary of Telangana State Finance Commission on 27 April 2025.

== Early life and education ==
Sabharwal was born in a Bengali family in Darjeeling, West Bengal to an Army officer, Colonel Pranab Das, and Purabi Das.

Sabharwal did her schooling at St. Ann's High School, Secunderabad. She was the all India topper in ICSE exam. She graduated in commerce from St Francis College for Women, Hyderabad. She was 23, when she cleared the Union Public Service Commission exam in 2000, securing All India fourth rank.

== Career ==
After completing administrative training in Lal Bahadur Shastri National Academy of Administration, Mussoorie in 2001, Sabharwal was trained in Adilabad district during her probation.

Her first independent charge was as Sub Collector, Madanapally in Chittoor which let her gain hands-on experience in Land Revenue Management & District Administration. Thereafter she worked in Rural Development sector as Project Director, DRDA, Kadapa.

She worked as a municipal commissioner, Warangal, where she introduced "Fund your City" scheme where a large number of public utilities such as Traffic Junctions, Foot-overbridges, Bus-stops, Parks were created with Public-Private partnership (PPP). Later, she served as Deputy Commissioner, Commercial Taxes, Visakhapatnam.

=== As district collector ===
Smita Sabharwal worked as joint collector of Kurnool and joint collector of Hyderabad.

In April 2011, she took charge as district collector, Karimnagar district where she made significant contribution in the Health and Education sector. The health initiative to improve institutional deliveries in the public sector popularly known as Ammalalana, was started and successfully implemented in the district. It became a role model for many health initiatives of ‘high risk pregnancy management targeting, IMR and MMR’ in NRHM of Government of India. This initiative was also nominated as one of the best initiatives for Prime Minister's award for excellence in public administration.

With the help of public representatives, Karimnagar town underwent a facelift in the form of wider roads, scientifically planned traffic junctions, bus-stops, Toilets and other public utilities. Karimnagar district was awarded the best district in PM's 20 Point Programme for 2012–2013. She successfully started a programme, Voter Panduga to increase polling percentage.

She also served as District Collector of Medak during the General Elections 2014 and successfully conducted free and fair polls registering a high polling turn out.

Sabharwal is known popularly as people's officer and is known to use latest developments in technology to her advantage, especially in implementing Government Programmes on field. Monitoring of Government doctors through skype has completely changed the scenario in the public health sector. Performance monitoring of Government schools through specially designed software has made Karimnagar & Medak Districts stand top in the state during her tenure.

== Awards ==
- Indian Express Devi Award - 2015, for Innovation and Dynamism
- e-India (e-Health Category) Government Digital Initiative – 2013
- Chief Minister's Award for best district in 21 Point Flagship Programme in 2011–12.
- Chief Minister's Award for best district in 20 Point Flagship Programme in 2012–13
- Recipient of "Platinum Award" worth ₹10.00 Lacs under District Category sponsored by Information Technology & Communication Department for the best e-Governance initiatives taken up at the district for the year 2012–13
- Nominated for Prime Minister's award under individual category for excellence in public administration in best district initiative "Ammalalana" programme in erstwhile united Government of Andhra Pradesh
