= Sailakshmi Balijepally =

Indian paediatrician and charity founder (1974–2023)

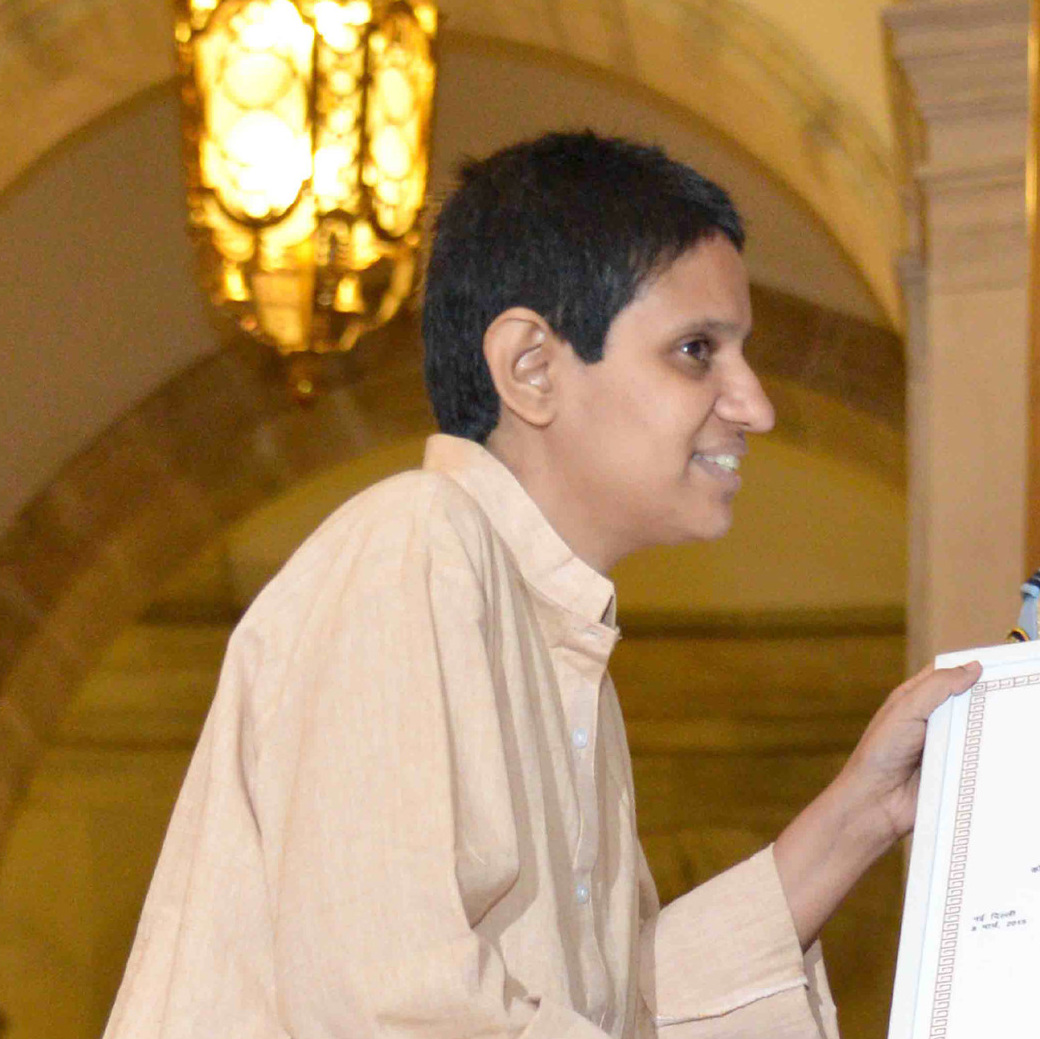
- Balijepally in 2015
- Born: Sailakshmi Balijepally; 25 January 1974
- Died: 16 December 2023 (aged 49); Chennai, Tamil Nadu, India
- Education: St Francis College for Women, Gandhi Medical College, Niloufer hospital, Osmania Medical College, Hyderabad, India.
- Occupation: Social worker
- Known for: Founding EKAM Foundation and receiving the Nari Shakti Puraskar award- 2014 by the President of India on 8th March, 2015.

Sailakshmi Balijepally (25 January 1974 – 16 December 2023) was an Indian paediatrician and the founder of Ekam Foundation, an NGO working in the areas of child and maternal health and well-being. She was awarded the Nari Shakti Award for the year 2014 by the president of India.

== Life and career ==
Balijepally was raised in Secunderabad, India, where she attended Keyes High School for Girls for twelve years. Her parents were both doctors and Balijepally aspired to become one too. Her elder sister, who also studied medicine and became a cardiologist, was her role model. She studied at St Francis College for Women for two years before being accepted by Gandhi Medical College. She studied there for five years and left qualified as both a physician and a surgeon.

On 20 January 2001, an earthquake hit Gujarat, killing 20,000 and injuring many more. Balijepally stepped forward to volunteer medical aid, despite it clashing with her exams. Seven years later, she volunteered again when the Bihar flood made millions homeless after a river changed course and flooded many inhabited areas.

Balijepally had been working as a junior consultant when she was tasked with working out how to support 60 orphanages. She teamed each one up with a paediatrician colleague, each of whom were keen to help, but in time the system did not work well. The establishment of the EKAM foundation in 2009 was her attempt to refocus on the problem of supplying care.

Balijepally was awarded one of the first eight Nari Shakti Puraskar awards for her leadership and achievements in 2015. The award was made on International Women's Day by then Indian President Pranab Mukherjee.

In 2018, EKAM foundation formed a partnership with Royal Enfield, with the aim of improving the health and well-being of mothers and children in Kancheepuram. In one instance, they donated medical equipment to the Chengalpattu Medical College.

https://www.ekamoneness.org/resources/EKAM/Reports/Annual%20Reports/2017-18.pdf

Balijepally visited the U.S. several times and also initiated the formation of EKAM USA.

Balijepally died on 16 December 2023, at the age of 49.
