= St Francis College for Women =

Catholic minority institution located in India

St. Francis College for Women
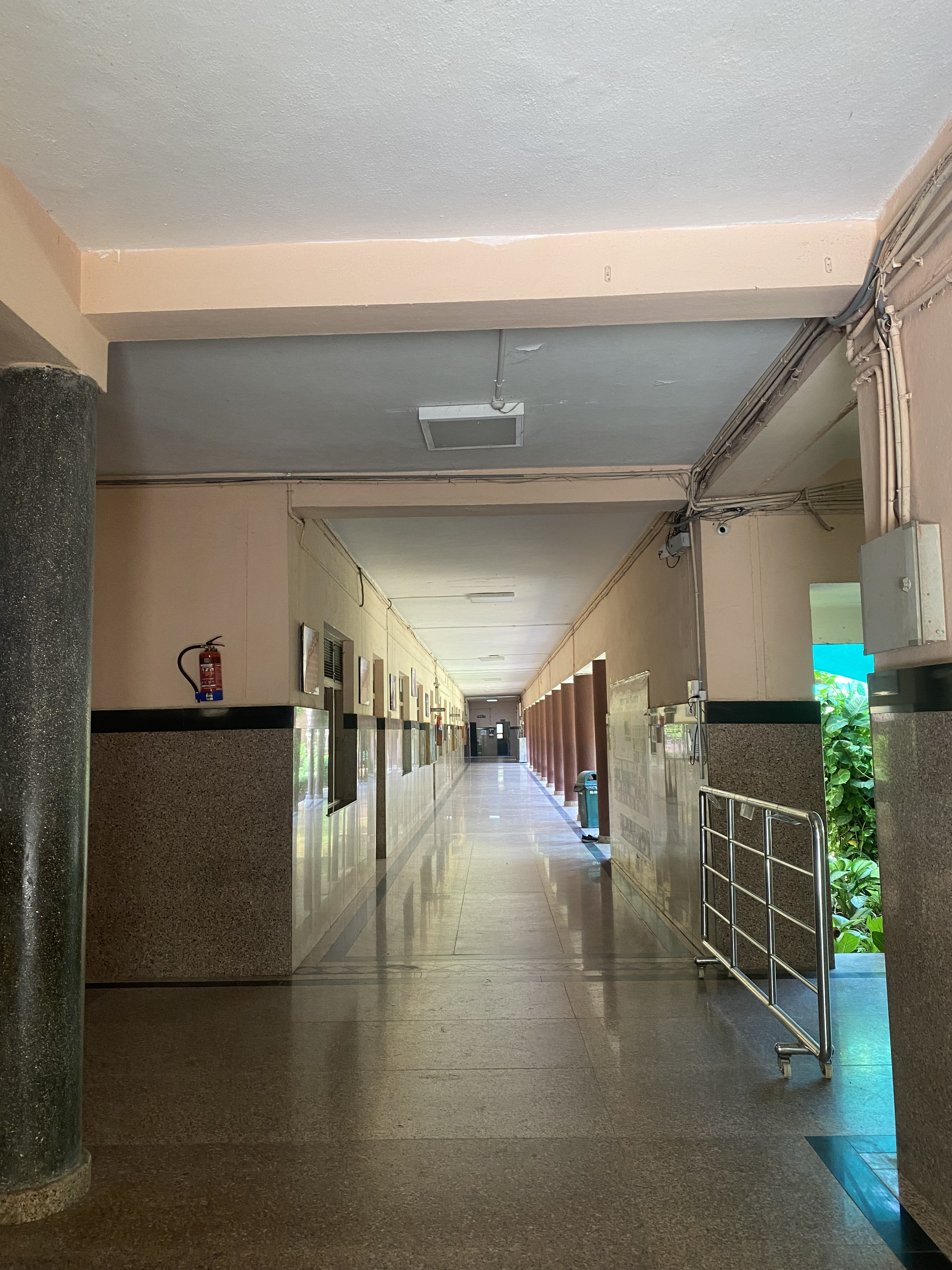
- Corridor inside St. Francis College for Women
- Established: 1959
- Location: 6, Uma Nagar, Begumpet, Hyderabad, Telangana, 500016, India; 17.4371226°N 78.460385°E
- Campus: Urban
- Website: www.sfc.ac.in

St. Francis College for Women is a Catholic minority institution which is located in Begumpet, Hyderabad, Telangana, India.

== History ==
It was founded by the Sisters of Charity of St. Bartolomea Capitanio and St. Vincenza Gerosa in 1959 for the education of women.

The college derives its inspiration from the teachings of Jesus Christ, who is its "norm, protector, and guide". As a minority institution, the college reserves for itself its inherent and constitutional right (art. 30 [1]) with regard to management and administration. The college was also judged Best Arts College, Best Science College and Best Commerce College in Hyderabad by India Today Magazine.

An American Corner Library was set up at the college by the Consulate General of the United States, Hyderabad in 2013 to provide access to materials and conversations on aspects of life and culture in the United States and nurture an Indo-US partnership.

== Dress code controversy ==
In August 2019, a new college rule that aimed to regulate the dress code of female students at the college disallowing sleeveless clothing, shorts and kurtis which were above knee length was introduced. Following this in September, girl students were subjected to a measurement check before they could enter the college campus. Several students protested against the college rule citing its misogynistic nature. In a viral video the college principal Sister Sandra Horta was seen tugging at girl's clothing following which students held protests for several days following which the ad hoc dress code rules were scrapped. Although the rules were scrapped, later on the rule was changed to "knee - length kurtis" in the next academic year.

== Notable alumni ==
- Smita Sabharwal - IAS officer
- Sailakshmi Balijepally - surgeon and charity founder
- Lakshmi Manchu - actress
- Malvika Nair - actress
- Nikitha Narayan - actress
- Sri Gouri Priya - actress

== See also ==
- Education in India
- Literacy in India
- List of institutions of higher education in Telangana
