= Azerbaijani Press Agency =

Azerbaijani Press Agency (APA, Azerbaijani: Azəri Press Agentliyi) is an Azerbaijani government press agency. It was registered on 8 January 2004 by the Ministry of Justice of Azerbaijan and became operational on 16 November 2004. The agency is a member of APA Holding LLC which also includes APA Servis LLC. APA Servis includes internet television channel APA.tv.

== Content ==
APA presents information in Azerbaijani, Russian and English. The news coverage includes political, economic, social, cultural and sports events in Azerbaijan, as well as breaking news about ongoing local and worldwide developments. In addition to offices in all regions of Azerbaijan, APA has foreign offices in Turkey, Russia, Iran, Georgia and the Great Britain.
