= Hokuma Aliyeva =

Azerbaijani flight attendant (1991–2024)

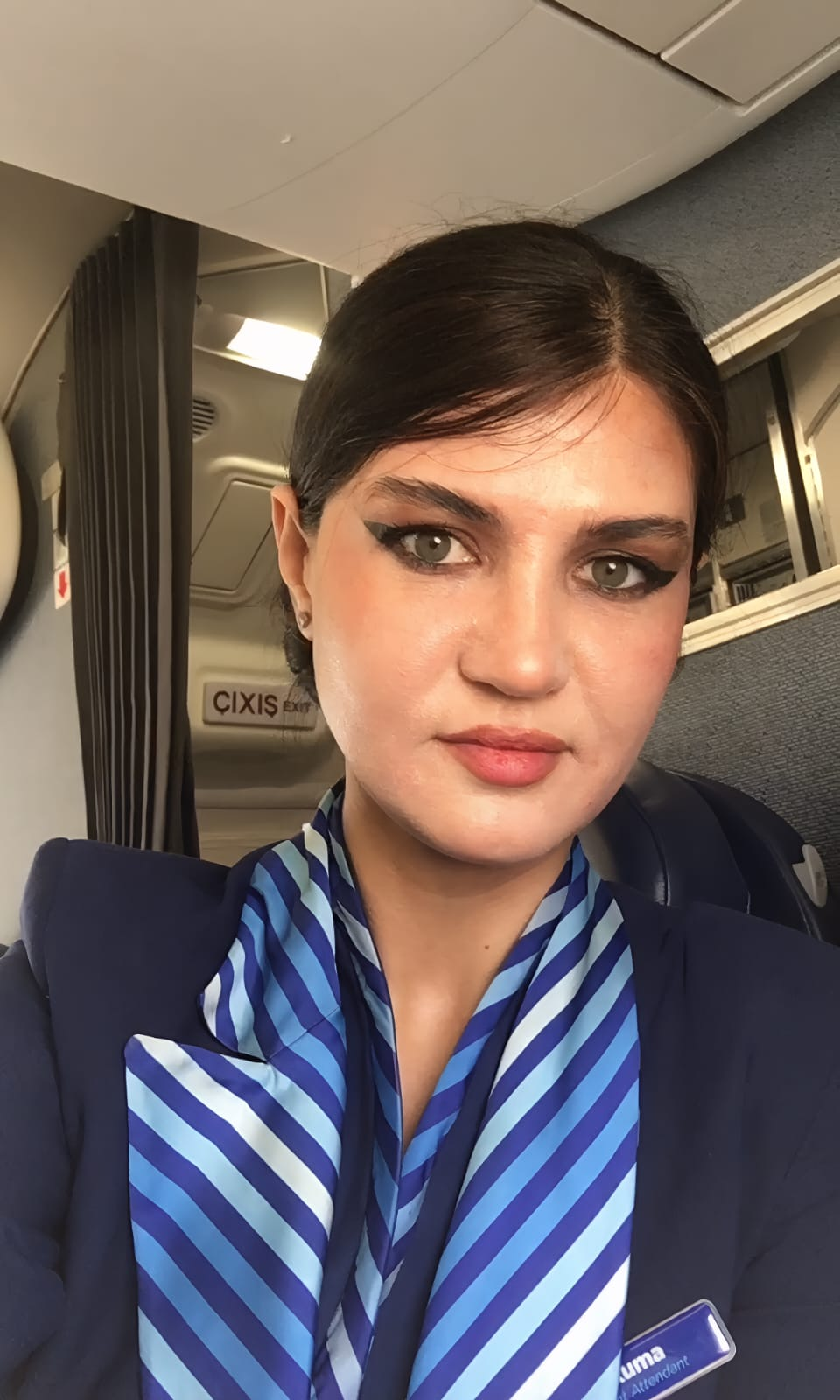
- Born: 8 August 1991; Susuzluq, Kalbajar District, Azerbaijan SSR, USSR
- Died: 25 December 2024 (aged 33); Aktau, Kazakhstan
- Cause of death: Aircraft accident
- Resting place: II Alley of Honor, Baku, Azerbaijan
- Occupation: Flight attendant

Hokuma Jalil qizi Aliyeva (Azerbaijani: Hökumə Cəlil qızı Əliyeva; 8 August 1991 – 25 December 2024) was an Azerbaijani flight attendant who was recognised as a National Hero of Azerbaijan.

== Early life and education ==
Hokuma Aliyeva was born on 8 August 1991, in Susuzluq, in the Kalbajar District of Azerbaijan SSR, USSR. In 1996 she and her family moved to Russia, living in the Volgograd region for some time. Hokuma attended School No. 178 in the city from the 1st to the 6th grade. Later, her family moved to Ganja, Azerbaijan, where she continued her education. She graduated from Secondary School No. 30 named after V. Veyselov in Ganja and scored 612 points in university entrance exams, gaining admission to the Faculty of Law at Baku State University.

== Career ==
Hokuma Aliyeva pursued postgraduate studies, enrolling in master's and doctoral programs. According to her father, Jalil Aliyev, she was in the final year of her doctoral studies. In 2016, she started working as a translator for Azerbaijan Airlines. She later continued her career as a flight attendant, performing her duties with great diligence. In subsequent years, she intended to transition to a career in law.

== Death ==
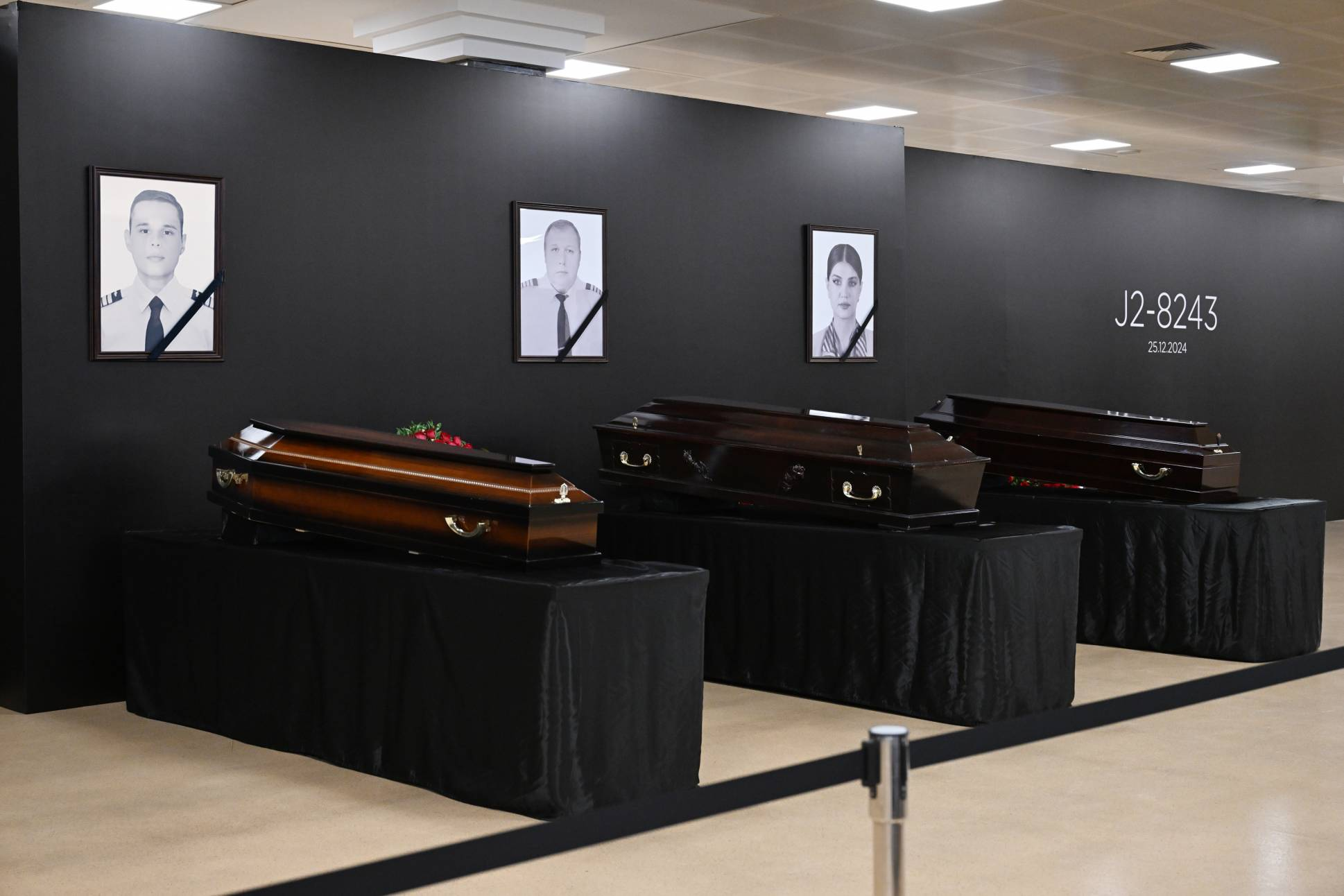
The farewell ceremony for the deceased crew members of Flight J8243, Heydar Aliyev International Airport (Aliyeva's coffin is on the right)

Aliyeva was one of the crew members who were killed in the plane crash of Azerbaijan Airlines Flight 8243 on 25 December 2024. She was 33. Aliyeva was serving as a flight attendant on the AZAL aircraft that crashed near Aktau International Airport, Aktau, Kazakhstan. Aliyeva spent her final moments calming passengers. Hokuma Aliyeva was buried on 29 December 2024, at the II Alley of Honor.

== Awards ==
On 29 December 2024, by the decree of the President of the Republic of Azerbaijan, Hokuma Aliyeva was posthumously awarded the title of "National Hero of Azerbaijan".

== See also ==
- Igor Kshnyakin, pilot who died in the same accident
- Aleksandr Kalyaninov, pilot who died in the same accident
