= Tania Soni =

Tania Vijay Kumar is an Indian beauty pageant titleholder who won the Mrs. India crown in Mumbai in 2003 and subsequently competed in Mrs. World. She first participated in a Miss Country Club pageant while still in college. She was then runner-up in Gladrags "Super model of the year" and a finalist for the Miss India title in 1998. She worked as a flight attendant.
