= II Alley of Honor =

Cemetery in Baku, Azerbaijan

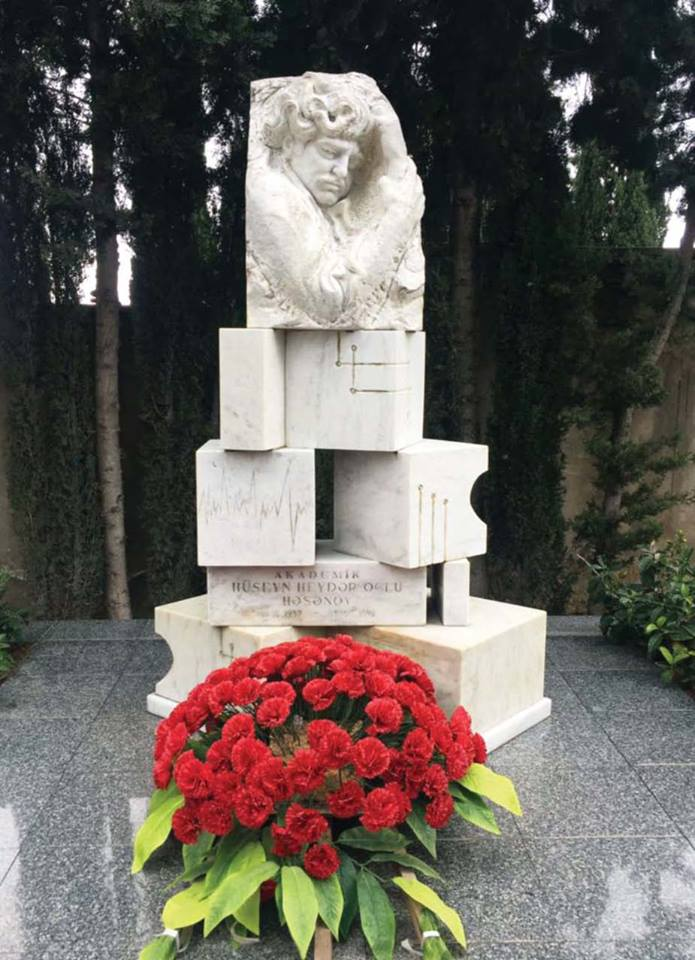
- Grave of Huseyn Hasanov
- Interactive map of II Alley of Honor

Details
- Established: In the late 1960s
- Location: Baku
- Country: Azerbaijan
- Coordinates: 40°21′31″N 49°48′33″E
- Type: Public

II Alley of Honor (Azerbaijani: II Fəxri Xiyaban) is a cemetery located in Yasamal district of Baku, Azerbaijan.

== Background ==
The cemetery was created in the late 1960s. Like the First Alley of Honor, prominent scientists, artists, politicians, national heroes of Azerbaijan, heroes of the Azerbaijan SSR, as well as well-known people who worked in the field of economy and agriculture are buried here. Those buried there are people who have been awarded high state awards.

In 2020, a new part of the alley was created. Polad Hashimov and Ilgar Mirzayev, who died during the military clash in Tovuz region on July 12-16, 2020, were the first people to be buried in the new part of the alley. More than 100 soldiers who died in the Second Karabakh War were also buried there.

== See also ==
- Alley of Honor
- Martyrs' Lane
