= Naïve art =

Art by a person lacking formal training

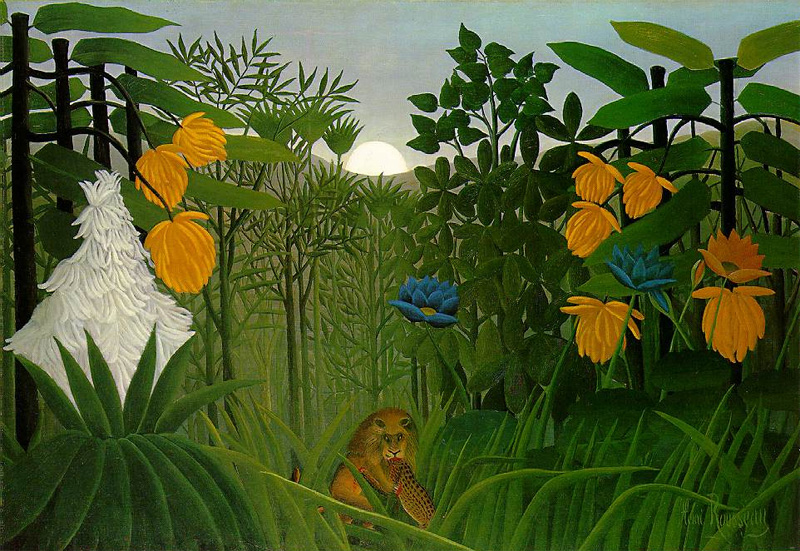
Henri Rousseau's The Repast of the Lion (circa 1907, Metropolitan Museum of Art) is an example of naïve art.

Naïve art is usually defined as visual art that is created by a person who lacks, or chooses not to use, the formal education and training that a professional artist undergoes (in anatomy, art history, technique, perspective, and ways of seeing). When this aesthetic is emulated by a trained artist, the result is sometimes called primitivism, pseudo-naïve art, or faux naïve art.

Unlike folk art, naïve art does not necessarily derive from a distinct popular cultural context or tradition; indeed, at least in the advanced economies and since the Printing Revolution, awareness of the local fine art tradition has been inescapable, as it diffused through popular prints and other media. Naïve artists are aware of "fine art" conventions such as graphical perspective and compositional conventions, but are unable to fully use them, or choose not to. By contrast, outsider art (art brut) denotes works from a similar context but which have only minimal contact with the mainstream art world.

Naïve art is recognized, and often imitated, for its childlike simplicity and frankness. Paintings of this kind typically have a flat rendering style with a rudimentary expression of perspective. One particularly influential painter of "naïve art" was Henri Rousseau (1844–1910), a French Post-Impressionist who was discovered by Pablo Picasso.

The definition of the term, and its "borders" with neighbouring terms such as folk art and outsider art, has been a matter of some controversy. Naïve art is a term usually used for the forms of fine art, such as paintings and sculptures, made by a self-taught artist, while objects with a practical use come under folk art. But this distinction has been disputed. Another term that may be used, especially of paintings and architecture, is "provincial", essentially used for work by artists who had received some conventional training, but whose work unintentionally falls short of metropolitan or court standards.

== Characteristics ==
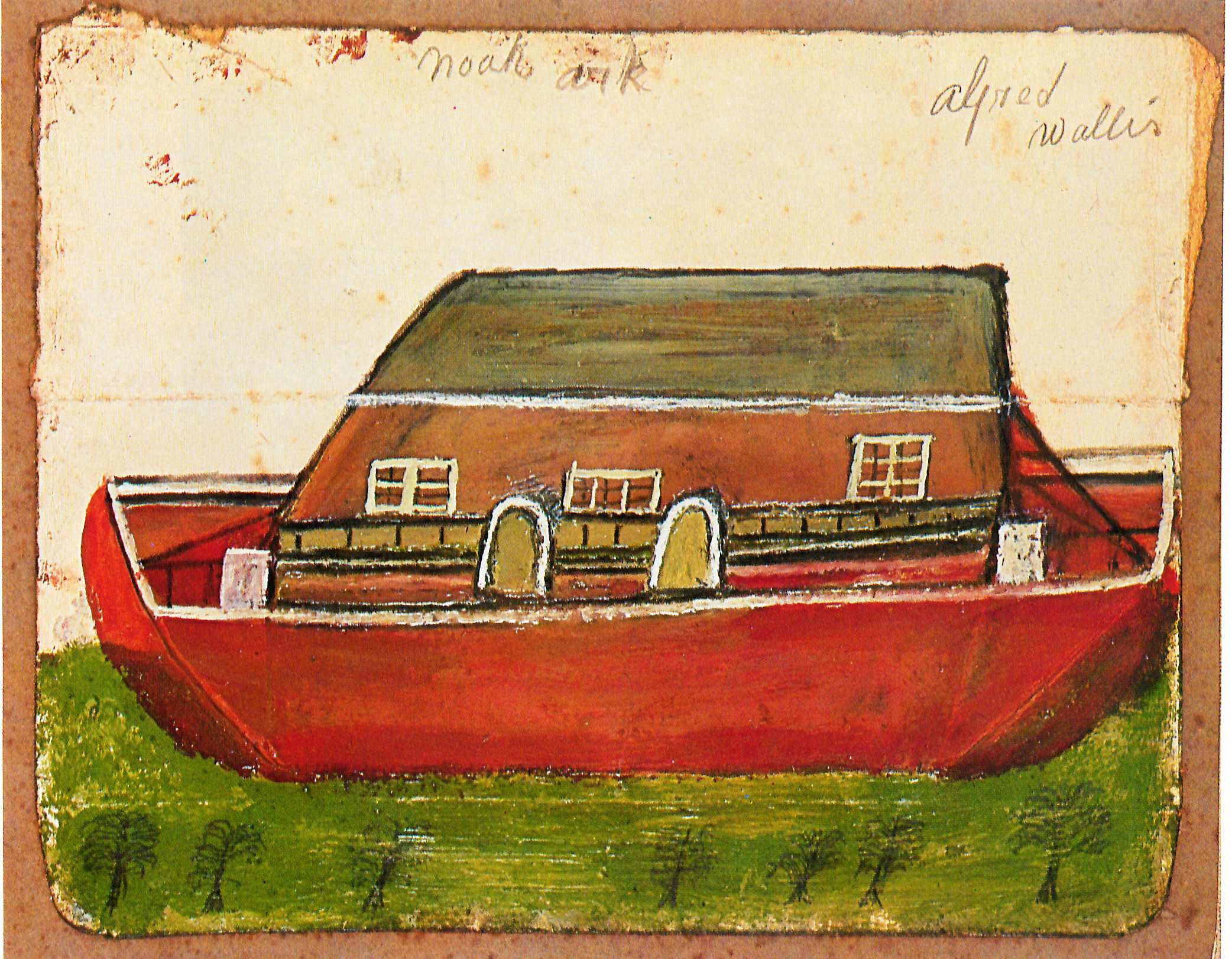
Alfred Wallis, 1942, before Noah's Ark, Zander Collection

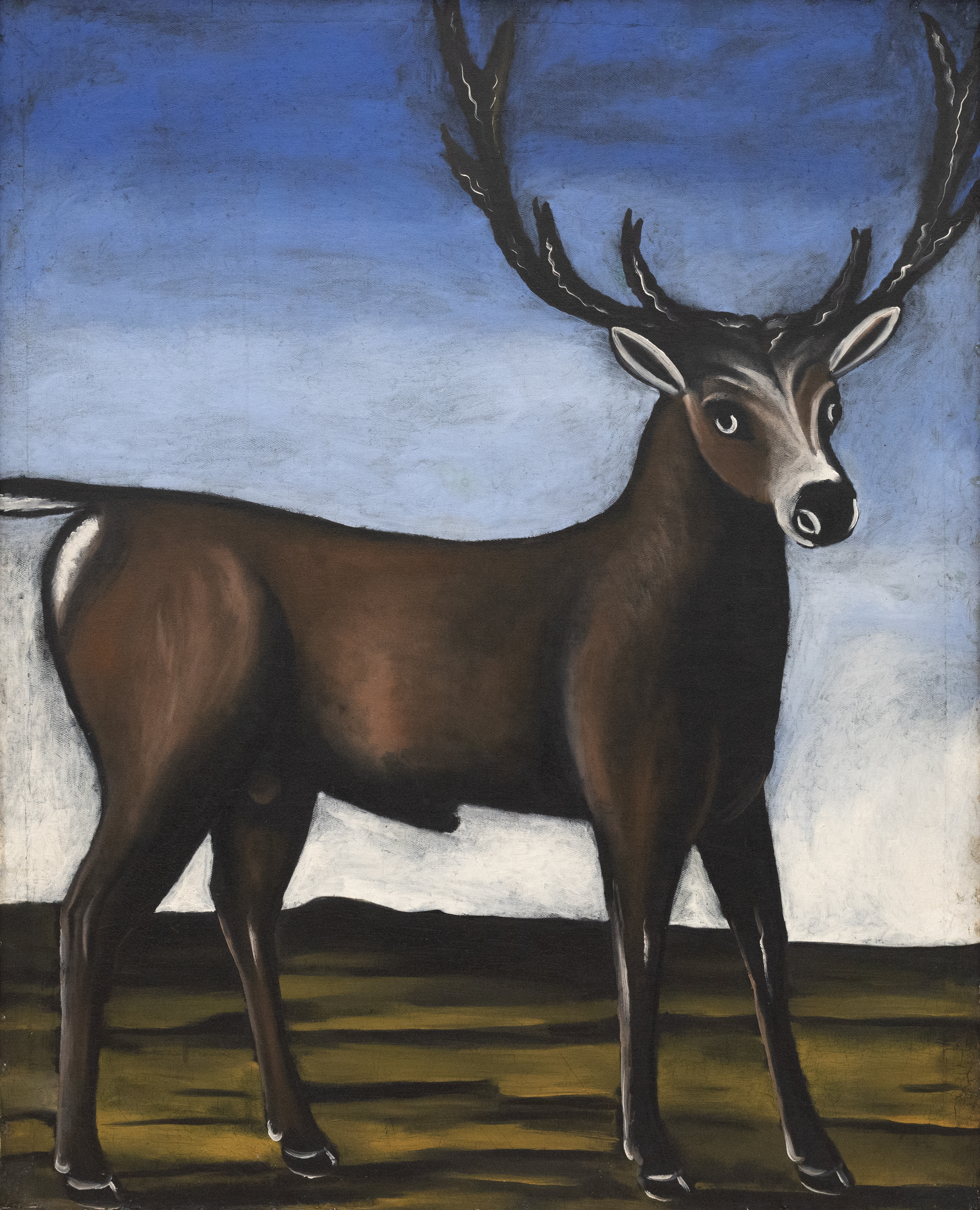
Niko Pirosmani, Deer, 1901

While naïve art was often viewed (prior to the twentieth century) as outsider art produced by those without formal (or little) training or degrees, it is now a fully recognized art genre, represented in art galleries and academies worldwide.

The characteristics of naïve art have an awkward relationship to the formal qualities of painting, especially not respecting the three rules of perspective (such as defined by the Progressive Painters of the Renaissance):

1. Decrease of the size of objects proportionally with distance,
2. Muting of colors with distance,
3. Decrease of the precision of details with distance,

The results are:

1. Effects of perspective geometrically erroneous (awkward aspect of the works, children's drawings look, or medieval painting look, but the comparison stops there)
2. Strong use of pattern, unrefined color on all the plans of the composition, without enfeeblement in the background,
3. An equal accuracy brought to details, including those of the background which should be shaded off.

Simplicity rather than subtlety are all supposed markers of naïve art. It has, however, become such a popular and recognizable style that many examples could be called pseudo-naïve.

Whereas naïve art ideally describes the work of an artist who did not receive formal education in an art school or academy, for example Henri Rousseau or Alfred Wallis, 'pseudo naïve' or 'faux naïve' art describes the work of an artist working in a more imitative or self-conscious mode and whose work can be seen as more imitative than original.

Strict naïvety is unlikely to be found in contemporary artists, given the expansion of Autodidactism as a form of education in modern times. Naïve categorizations are not always welcome by living artists, but this is likely to change as dignifying signals are known. Museums devoted to naïve art now exist in Kecskemét, Hungary; Kovačica, Serbia; Riga, Latvia; Jaén, Spain; Rio de Janeiro, Brazil; Vicq and Paris, France.

"Primitive art" is another term often applied to art by those without formal training, but is historically more often applied to work from certain cultures that have been judged socially or technologically "primitive" by Western academia, such as Native American, subsaharan African or Pacific Island art (see Tribal art). This is distinguished from the self-conscious, "primitive" inspired movement primitivism. Another term related to (but not completely synonymous with) naïve art is folk art.

The terms "naïvism" and "primitivism" also exist, and are usually applied to professional painters working in the style of naïve art (like Paul Gauguin, Mikhail Larionov, and Paul Klee).

== Term and criticism ==
In 1870, in his poem Au Cabaret-Vert, 5 heures du soir, Arthur Rimbaud uses the word naïf to designate "clumsy" pictorial representations: "I contemplated the very naive subjects of the tapestry", which is perhaps the case of the origin of the naïf employment by Guillaume Apollinaire some time later.

In recent years, an increasingly critical view has developed of the different, often discriminatory terms (e.g. "naïve art", "outsider art", "primitive art") and the separation of non-academic and academic art. According to art historian and curator Susanne Pfeffer, being an artist is not a choice but a destiny; only one's background, gender or class determines whether someone can study art and thus be socially recognized as an artist. Art that therefore does not take place within the recognized system is usually rejected by this system. Due to the system's power of definition, which always lies with the system and not with the artists themselves, exclusionary terms are used that are never intended to be inclusive.

The art critic Jerry Saltz advocates abolishing the separation between "outsider art" and institutionalized, official art and including non-academic art in the presentation of permanent collections in major museums. He calls for artists such as Hilma af Klint, Bill Traylor, Adolf Wölfli and John Kane to be canonized, as their discrimination tells a false and untruthful story of art history.

Roberta Smith, art critic for the New York Times, also advocates a dissolution of the separation of non-academic and academic art and calls for museums to integrate non-academic art equally into their collection presentations. Smith points to the outstanding artistic quality of works by self-taught artists, which require a rewriting of the 20th-century art canon.

In 2023 and 2024, the Sprengel Museum Hannover and the Kunstsammlungen Chemnitz presented the exhibition Which Modernism? In- and Outsiders of the Avant-Garde, with the intention of correcting the view of "naive" artists as "outsiders" and demonstrating their close links to the avant-garde. The exhibition described "naive art" as a part of modernism and a stylistic phenomenon of equal status. "Naïve" artists followed their own style, influencing other artists and being influenced by other artists.

== Movements ==
=== The Sacred Heart painters ===
German art collector and critic Wilhelm Uhde is known as the principal organiser of the first Naïve Art exhibition, which took place in Paris in 1928. The participants were Henri Rousseau, André Bauchant, Camille Bombois, Séraphine Louis and Louis Vivin, known collectively as the Sacred Heart painters.

=== Hlebine School ===
A term applied to Croatian naïve painters working in or around the village of Hlebine, near the Hungarian border, from about 1930. At this time, according to the World Encyclopedia of Naive Art (1984), the village amounted to little more than 'a few muddy winding streets and one-storey houses', but it produced such a remarkable crop of artists that it became virtually synonymous with Yugoslav naïve painting.

Hlebine is a small picturesque municipality in the north of Croatia that in 1920s became a setting against which a group of self-taught peasants began to develop a unique and somewhat revolutionary style of painting. This was instigated by leading intellectuals of the time such as the poet Antun Gustav Matoš and the biggest name in Croatian literature, Miroslav Krleža, who called for an individual national artistic style that would be independent from Western influences. These ideas were picked up by a celebrated artist from Hlebine – Krsto Hegedušić and he went on to found the Hlebine School of Art in 1930 in search of national "rural artistic expression".

Ivan Generalić was the first master of the Hlebine School, and the first to develop a distinctive personal style, achieving a high standard in his art.

After the Second World War, the next generation of Hlebine painters tended to focus more on stylized depictions of country life taken from imagination. Generalić continued to be the dominant figure, and encouraged younger artists, including his son Josip Generalić.

The Hlebine school became a worldwide phenomenon with the 1952 Venice Biennale and exhibitions in Brazil and Brussels.

Other naìve artists of the Hlebine school iclude Dragan Gaži, Maria Prymachenko, Josip Generalić, Krsto Hegedušić, Mijo Kovačić, Ivan Lacković-Croata, Franjo Mraz, Ivan Večenaj and Mirko Virius.

=== In Jewish art ===
In the late 19th and early 20th century, several Jewish artists in Israel were influenced by ancient art of the Middle East and thus were inspired to paint in a style reminiscent of naive art. Moshe Mizrahi Shah, a rabbi from Tehran who settled in Safed in the late 19th century painted biblical scenes inspired by the ancient arts as well as Eastern European Jewish representation. In the 1920s, when Ecole de Paris artist, Yitzhak Frenkel arrived to Safed he was influenced by Shah and created works depicting biblical scenes and figures, such as the Binding of Isaac. Frenkel's work was described by Israeli art historian Gideon Ofrat as a "historical Eretz Israeli encounter between popular art and so-called 'high' art".

== Museums and galleries ==
- Croatian Museum of Naïve Art, Zagreb, Croatia
- Musée international d'Art naïf Anatole Jakovsky, Nice, France
- Musée d'Art Naïf – Max Fourny, Paris, France
- International Museum of Naive Art, Vicq, France
- Museum of Bad Art, Massachusetts
- National Folk Decorative Art Museum, Kyiv, Ukraine

== See also ==
- Autodidacticism
- Anatole Jakovsky
- Chicago Imagists
- Neo-primitivism
- Outsider art
