= Séraphine (film) =

- French release poster
- Directed by: Martin Provost
- Written by: Marc Abdelnour; Martin Provost
- Produced by: Milena Poylo; Gilles Sacuto
- Starring: Yolande Moreau; Ulrich Tukur
- Cinematography: Laurent Brunet
- Edited by: Ludo Troch
- Music by: Michael Galasso
- Distributed by: Diaphana Films (France)
- Release date: 1 October 2008 (France)
- Running time: 125 minutes
- Countries: France; Belgium
- Languages: French; German
- Budget: $3.6 million
- Box office: $9.4 million

Séraphine is a 2008 French-Belgian film directed by Martin Provost and written by Marc Abdelnour and Provost. It stars Yolande Moreau as the French painter Séraphine Louis and Ulrich Tukur as Wilhelm Uhde. It won the 2009 César Award for Best Film.

== Plot ==
The film follows the life of a middle-aged housekeeper, Séraphine Louis, who has a remarkable talent for painting. Untaught and following what she regards as religious inspiration she finds great appreciation in the beauty found in nature, especially her daily walks to work where she proudly and humbly stops to gaze at trees. In the beginning, it is noted that she stops to collect soil from plants as well as some blood from a dead pig. Later, in her small home lit by candles she is seen using these same ingredients while creating her art. At one point when her art begins to be seen, she is asked how she achieves the unusual effect in her "rouge" (reds). She replies that she prefers to keep that a secret.

Uhde, a noted art critic, encounters her first as a housekeeper and then sees one of her paintings, which he regards as very promising. Séraphine feels she is just a housekeeper and no one will take her seriously, but Uhde firmly assures her she has a talent and that he will look after her and promote her work. He kindly tells her to follow her gift, but he is a German and has to flee France and leave Séraphine when the 1914 war begins. However, she continues to do her paintings. In 1927, Uhde encounters Séraphine again and considers her work to have greatly improved. He begins buying her pictures and encouraging her to do nothing but paint, giving her a generous monthly stipend. But prosperity upsets the woman's balance; she buys an expensive bridal gown even though she has no suitor, and claims to have received an important message from the angels. As the Great Depression gets under way, Uhde can no longer sell her paintings and is forced to disappoint Séraphine, who has begun to regard herself as a woman of means. She is mentally affected by the setback.

After she rouses the town while wearing her bridal gown, she is put into a lunatic asylum and eventually stops painting. Uhde visits but is advised not to make contact since this would deeply upset her, even to be told that he has finally sold some of her artworks. He decides to care for her well-being and secures her a room in the institution which enables her to go outside, where she begins to enjoy the beauties of nature again. It is revealed that she died in 1942 and that her art became famous and respected.

== Cast ==
- Yolande Moreau as Séraphine Louis
- Ulrich Tukur as Wilhelm Uhde
- Anne Bennent as Anne-Marie Uhde
- Geneviève Mnich as Madame Duphot
- Nico Rogner as Helmut Kolle
- Adélaïde Leroux as Minouche
- Serge Larivière as Duval
- Françoise Lebrun as Mother Superior
- Anne Benoît as Madame Delonge

== Critical response ==
The film has received critical acclaim. Review aggregator Rotten Tomatoes reports that 89% of 92 critics gave the film a positive review, for an average rating of 7.5/10. The site's consensus states that "Seraphine is a well-crafted French film that effectively captures one woman's experience with art, religion, and mental illness, and features a brilliant performance from Yolande Moreau." Metacritic gave the film a score of 84 out of 100, based on 22 critics, indicating "universal acclaim". Jason Solomons of The Guardian said that "Martin Provost's life of the painter Séraphine de Senlis is a study in subtlety worthy of Flaubert".

== Awards and nominations ==
- César Awards
  - Won: Best Actress – Leading Role (Yolande Moreau)
  - Won: Best Cinematography (Laurent Brunet)
  - Won: Best Costume Design (Madeline Fontaine)
  - Won: Best Film
  - Won: Best Music Written for a Film (Michael Galasso)
  - Won: Best Production Design (Thierry François)
  - Won: Best Original Screenplay (Marc Abdelnour and Martin Provost)
  - Nominated: Best Director (Martin Provost)
  - Nominated: Best Sound (Emmanuel Croset, Ingrid Ralet and Philippe Vandendriessche)
- European Film Awards
  - Nominated: Best Actress (Yolande Moreau)
- Los Angeles Film Critics
  - Won: Best Actress (Yolande Moreau)
- National Society of Film Critics
  - Won: Best Actress (Yolande Moreau)
