= Séraphine Louis =

French painter

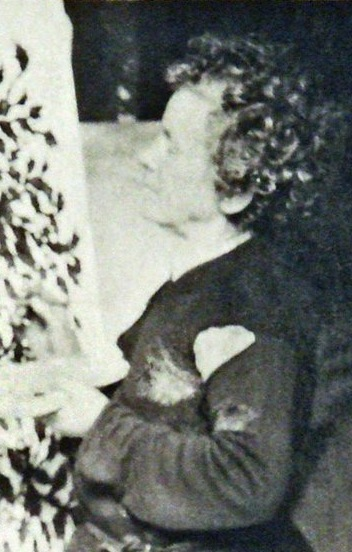
- Born: 3 September 1864; Arsy, France
- Died: 11 December 1942 (aged 78); Villers-sous-Erquery, France
- Education: self-taught
- Known for: painting
- Patrons: Wilhelm Uhde

Séraphine Louis, known as Séraphine de Senlis (Séraphine of Senlis; 3 September 1864 – 11 December 1942), was a French painter and artist. Self-taught, she was inspired by her religious faith and by stained-glass church windows and other religious art.

== Early life ==
Louis was born in Arsy (Oise) on 3 September 1864. Her father was a manual laborer and her mother came from a farmworking background. Louis's mother died on her first birthday and her father, who remarried, also died before she was seven; at which point, she came under the charge of her eldest sister. She first worked as a shepherdess but, by 1881, she was engaged as a domestic worker at the convent of the Sisters of Providence in Clermont, Oise. Beginning in 1901, she was employed as a housekeeper for middle-class families in the town of Senlis.

== Career ==
In addition to her arduous day jobs, Louis painted by candlelight, largely in secret isolation, until her considerable body of work was discovered in 1912 by German art collector Wilhelm Uhde. While in Senlis, Uhde saw a still-life of apples at his neighbor's house and was astonished to learn that Louis, his housecleaner, was the artist. His support had barely begun to lift her horizons when he was forced to leave France in August 1914; the war between France and Germany had made him an unwelcome outsider in Senlis. They only re-established contact in 1927 when Uhde – back in France and living in Chantilly – visited an exhibition of local artists in Senlis and, seeing Louis's work, realized that she had survived and her art had flourished. Under Uhde's patronage, Louis began painting large canvases, some of them two meters high, and she achieved prominence as an artist. In 1929, Uhde organized an exhibition, "Painters of the Sacred Heart," that featured Louis's art, launching her into a period of financial success she had never known – and was ill prepared to manage. Then, in 1930, with the effects of the Great Depression destroying the finances of her patrons, Uhde had no choice but to stop buying her paintings.

== Death ==
In 1932, Louis was admitted for chronic psychosis at Clermont's lunatic asylum, where her artistry found no outlet. Although Uhde reported that she had died in 1934, some say that Louis actually lived until 1942 in a hospital annex at Villers-sous-Erquery, where she died friendless and alone. She was buried in a common grave.

== After ==
Uhde continued to exhibit her work: in 1932, at the exhibition "The Modern Primitives" in Paris; in 1937–38 in an exhibition titled "The Popular Masters of Reality" which showed in Paris, Zurich, and New York (at the Museum of Modern Art); in 1942, at the "Primitives of the 20th Century" exhibition in Paris, and finally, in 1945, in a solo exhibition of her work in Paris.

== Works ==
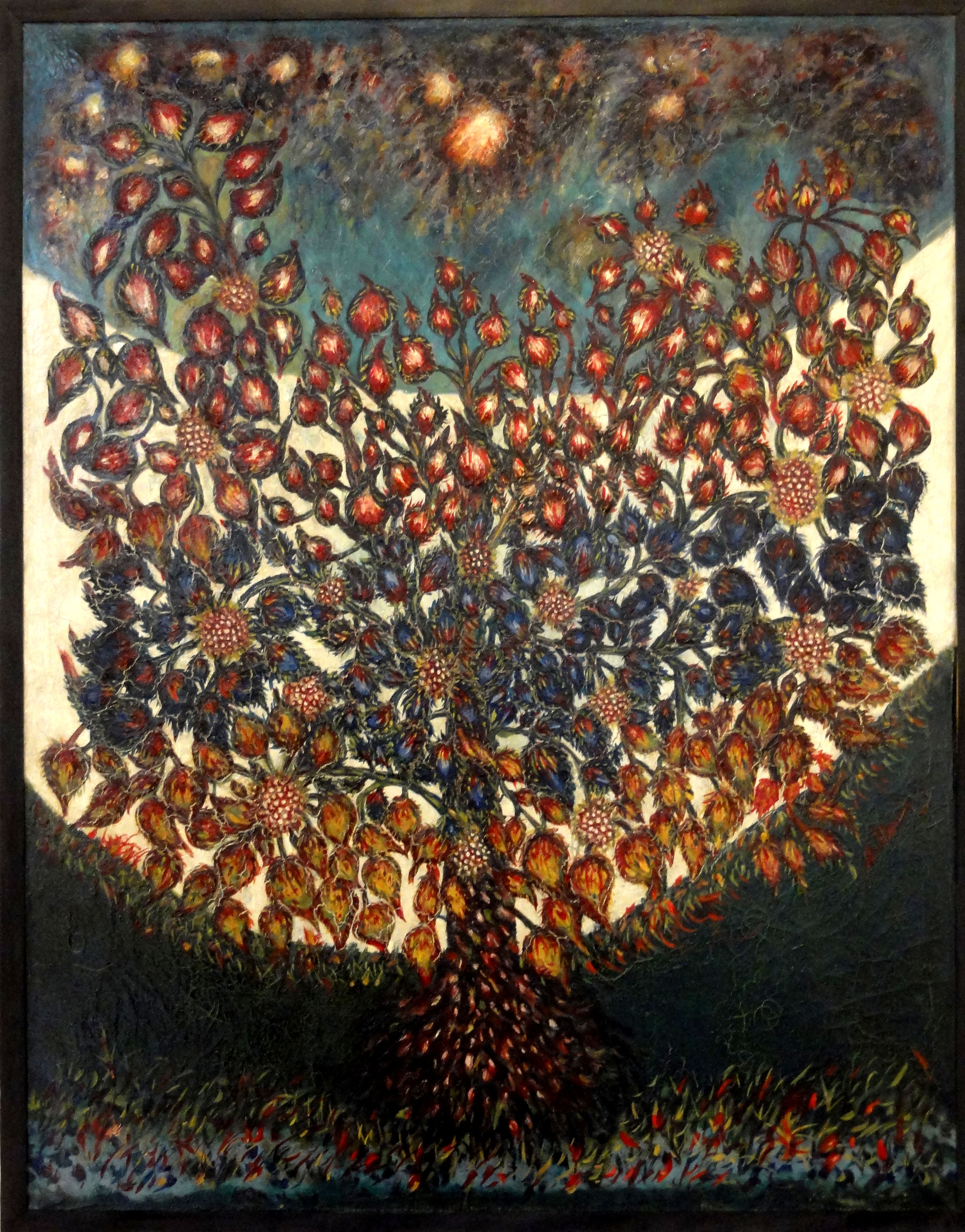
L'arbre de vie ("The tree of life"), 1928

Louis's works are predominantly rich fantasies of intensely repeated and embellished floral arrangements. She used colours and pigments that she made herself from unusual and exotic ingredients she never revealed that have stood the test of time for durable vividness. Her paintings' surfaces have a matte, almost waxy appearance. Sometimes her signature (typically "S. Louis") was carved by knife, revealing a ground of contrasting colour. In some cases, she appears to have signed her paintings before painting them.

Louis was an artist consumed by an irrepressible urge to create, "this famous internal necessity of which Kandinsky spoke", terms employed by Bertrand Lorquin, conservator of the Musée Maillol in his introduction to the exhibition "Séraphine Louis dite Séraphine de Senlis" at the Musée Maillol in Paris, which ran from 1 October 2008 to 18 May 2009.

== Legacy ==
A large number of Louis' works are part of the Zander Collection in Cologne. Her paintings are also exhibited in the Musée d'art de Senlis, the Museum of Modern Art in New York, the Musée d'art naïf in Nice, and the Musée d'Art moderne Lille Métropole in Villeneuve-d'Ascq.

In 2009, the French biographical film Séraphine by director Martin Provost won seven César Awards, including Best Film and Best Actress for Yolande Moreau who starred in the title role. The film explores the relationship between Louis and Wilhelm Uhde from their first encounter in 1912 until her days in the Clermont Asylum.

== Exhibitions (selection) ==
- Séraphine Louis. De Senlis et sans rivale, Centre Pompidou-Metz, Metz (31.11.2026-12.04.2027)
- The Unboxing Experience, Clemens Sels Museum Neuss, Neuss (12.4.–15.6.2025)
- Exhibition 01 | André Bauchant | Camille Bombois | Séraphine Louis | Henri Rousseau | Louis Vivin, Zander Collection, Cologne (25.11.2023–24.4.2024)
- Welche Moderne? In- und Outsider der Avantgarde. Sprengel Museum Hannover, Hanover (6.5.2023–17.9.2023), Kunstsammlungen Chemnitz, Chemnitz (22.10.2023–14.1.2024)
- Die Maler des Heiligen Herzens, Museum Frieder Burda, Baden-Baden (16.7.2022–20.11.2022), Museen Böttcherstraße, Bremen (3.12.2022–12.3.2023)
- 27 Artists, 209 Works, Zander Collection, Bönnigheim (23.3.–28.8.2016)
- Der Schatten der Avantgarde. Rousseau und die vergessenen Maler. Folkwang Museum, Essen (2.10.2015–10.1.2016)
- Séraphine de Senlis, Fondation Dina Vierny, Musée Maillol, Paris (1.10.2008–5.1.2009)
- Die Kunst der Naiven. Themen und Beziehungen. Haus der Kunst, Munich (1.11.1974–12.1.1975), Kunsthaus Zürich, Zurich (25.1.1975–31.3.1975)
- documenta. Kunst des XX. Jahrhunderts. Internationale Ausstellung, Museum Fridericianum, Kassel (16.7.1955–18.9.1955)
- Masters of Popular Painting. Modern Primitives of Europe and America. Museum of Modern Art, New York (27.4.–24.7.1938)
- Les Peintres du cœur sacré, Galerie des Quatres Chemins, Paris (8.6.–21.6.1928)

== Bibliography ==
- Wilhelm Uhde, Cinq Maitres Primitifs, pp. 127–139, Librairie Palmes (3, place Saint-Sulpice, Paris), Philippe Daudy Editeur, Paris, 1949
- H M Gallot Séraphine, bouquetiére 'sans rivale' des fleurs maudites de l'instinct in L'Information artistique, N° 40, Etude de, pp 32, mai 1957
- Jean-Pierre Foucher, Séraphine de Senlis, Éditions du Temps, coll., Paris, 1968, pp 124.
- Alain Vircondelet, Séraphine de Senlis, Albin Michel, coll., Une Vie, Paris, 1986, pp 217, 8 p. de planches illustrées.
- Alain Vircondelet, Séraphine : de la peinture à la folie, éditions Albin Michel, Paris, 2008, pp 211.
- Françoise Cloarec, Séraphine : la vie rêvée de Séraphine de Senlis, Éditions Phébus, Paris, 2008, pp 172, 8 p. de planches illustrées .
- Marie-Jo Bonnet, Séraphine Louis, un génie singulier, LM, Lesbia mag, N° 265, décembre 2008.
- Catalogue de l'exposition Séraphine de Senlis, présentée à Paris, du 1st octobre 2008 au 5 janvier 2009, par la Fondation Dina Vierny et le Musée Maillol, avec la collaboration de la ville de Senlis. Textes de Bertrand Lorquin, Wilhelm Uhde et Jean-Louis Derenne. Publication : éditions Gallimard, Fondation Dina Vierny et Musée Maillol, Paris, 2008, pp 55, (Gallimard) ou (Fondation Dina Vierny et Musée Maillol).
- Susanne Zander, 26 Artists. Works from the Zander Collection, Verlag der Buchhandlung Walther und Franz König, Cologne, 2023, p. 191-200.
- Pierre Guénégan, Séraphine, Annoted catalog of paintings, Publisher Lanwell & Leeds, Ltd, Londres, 2021, (ISBN 978-2-9700494-9-4)
