= Wilhelm Uhde =

German art dealer (1874–1947)

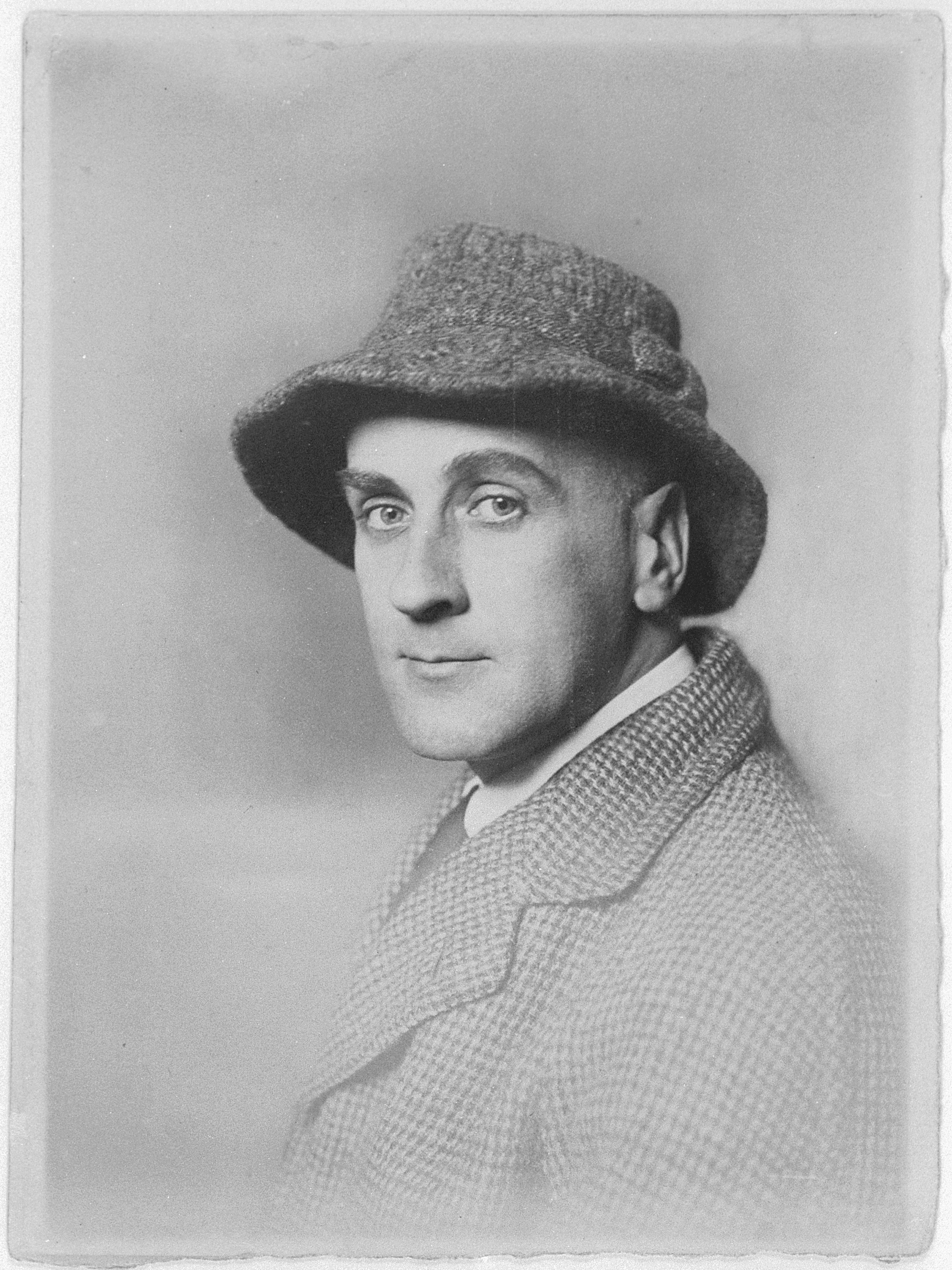
- portrait photograph, c.1910
- Born: October 28, 1874; Friedeberg, Province of Brandenburg
- Died: August 17, 1947 (aged 72); Paris, France
- Occupations: art collector, dealer, author

Wilhelm Uhde (28 October 1874 – 17 August 1947) was a German art collector, dealer, author, and critic, an early collector of modernist painting, and a significant figure in the career of Henri Rousseau.

== Career ==
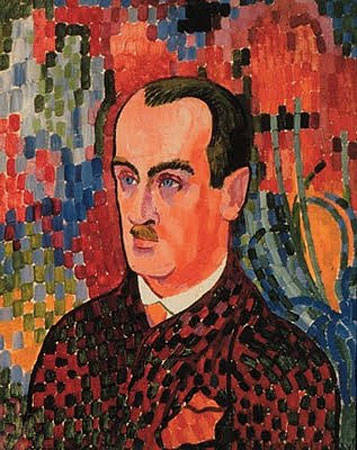
Robert Delaunay, 1907, Portrait of Wilhelm Uhde. Robert Delaunay and Sonia Terk met through Wilhelm Uhde, with whom Sonia had been married as she said for "convenience"

Born into a Jewish family, in Friedeberg, Province of Brandenburg (now Poland), Uhde studied law in Dresden but switched to art history, studying in Munich and Florence before moving to Paris in 1904. He purchased his first Picasso in 1905, and was one of the first collectors of the Cubist paintings of Pablo Picasso and Georges Braque. He met the artists Robert Delaunay, Sonia Terk, and Henri Rousseau in 1907. Uhde and Sonia Terk married in 1908, reportedly a marriage of convenience, they divorced in 1910 and Terk married Robert Delaunay.

Uhde established his art dealership in Paris, opening his own art gallery in 1908 to exhibit Georges Braque, Jean Metzinger, Sonia Delaunay, André Derain, Raoul Dufy, Auguste Herbin, Jules Pascin, and Pablo Picasso. Uhde commissioned Picasso to paint his portrait in 1910.

Pablo Picasso, 1910, Portrait of Wilhelm Uhde, oil on canvas, 81 x 60 cm, Joseph Pulitzer Collection

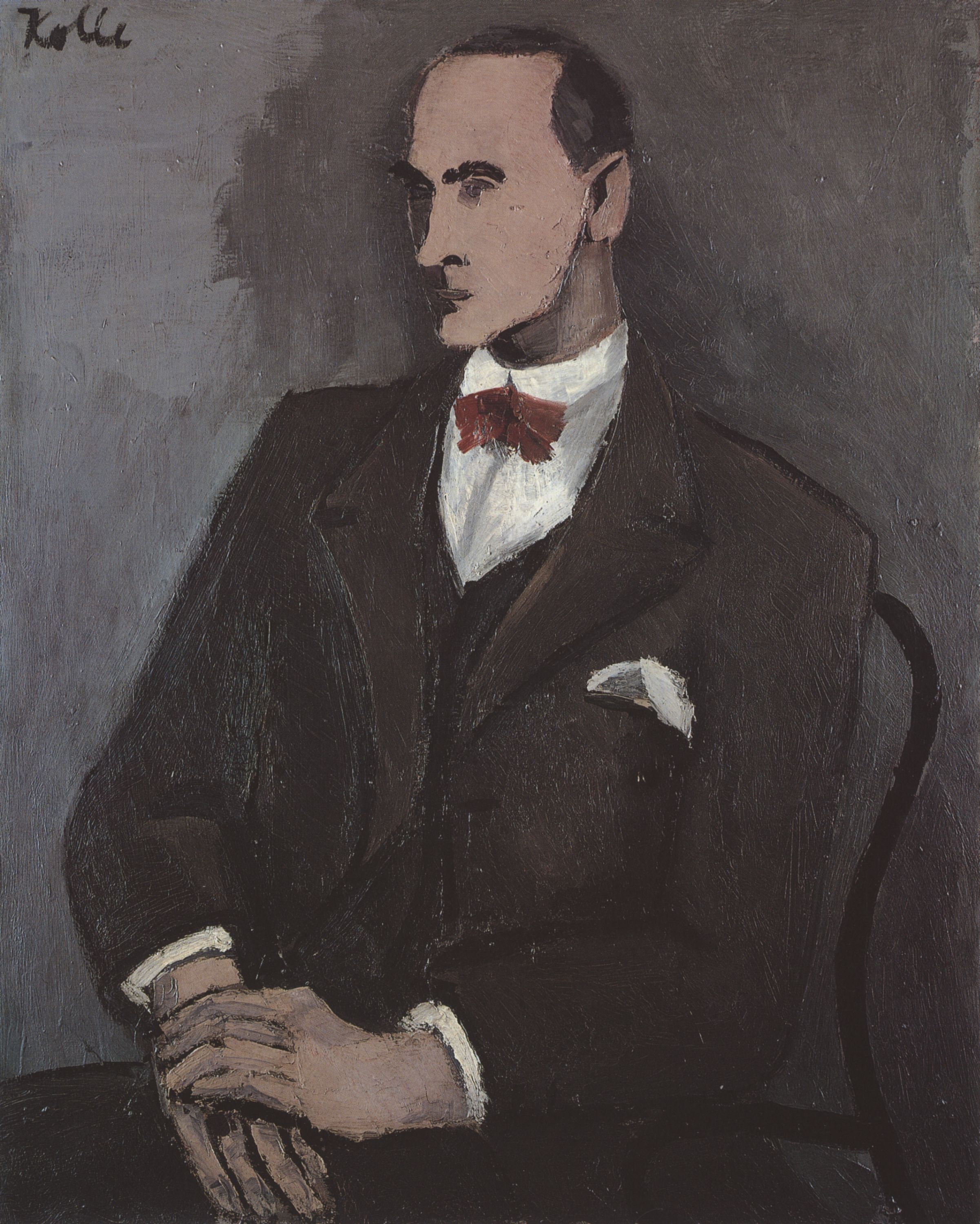
Helmut Kolle, ca.1930, Portrait of Wilhelm Uhde

Uhde promoted naïve art and in particular the work of Henri Rousseau in France and abroad. Uhde exhibited art in naïve style as well as fauvism style in his own gallery at rue Notre Dame des Champs during Montparnasse's heyday. In 1908 he launched a traveling exhibition of Impressionist art in Basel and Zürich. In 1912 he mounted a posthumous retrospective exhibition for Rousseau at the Galerie Bernheim-Jeune in Paris. At the outbreak of World War I in 1914 Uhde's collection was confiscated by the French state. The collection included works by Georges Braque, Raoul Dufy, Juan Gris, Auguste Herbin, Marie Laurencin, Fernand Léger, Jean Metzinger, Pablo Picasso, Jean Puy, and Henri Rousseau. The collection was sold by the French government in a series of auctions at the Hôtel Drouot in 1921.

From 1919 to 1920, Uhde worked with Helmut Kolle and lived with him in Chantilly, France. Uhde became active as a pacifist in Weimar Germany, but returned to France in 1924, moving back to Chantilly in 1927. Uhde is today known for two exhibitions. The “Les Peintres du Coeur-Sacré” in 1928 and “Les Primitifs modernes” in 1932, but also noted for bundling artists who had previously been ignored in a single exhibition space for the first time.

He spent the World War II in hiding in southern France, at one point helped by the art critic and resistance leader Jean Cassou. He died in Paris.

== The Sacred Heart painters ==
Uhde is also known as the principal organiser of the first Naive Art exhibition, which took place in Paris in 1928. The participants were Henri Rousseau, André Bauchant, Camille Bombois, Séraphine Louis, and Louis Vivin, known collectively as the Sacred Heart painters. Uhde discovered the talent of Séraphine Louis, who had been Uhde's housecleaner, and then sponsored her from 1912 to 1930.

== Writings ==
- Picasso et la tradition française, Paris : Les Quatre Chemins, 1928
- Cinq maîtres primitifs, Paris, 1949
- Von Bismarck bis Picasso: Erinnerungen und Bekenntnisse (1938) recent editions:
  - Uhde, Wilhelm (2010). Von Bismarck bis Picasso: Erinnerungen und Bekenntnisse. Römerhof Verlag. ISBN 978-3-905894-06-6.
  - Uhde, Wilhelm (2002). De Bismarck à Picasso. ISBN 2-910342-22-0.

== Legacy ==
A significant part of Uhde's life story is told in the 2008 French film Séraphine by director Martin Provost, focusing on the encounter and subsequent role of Séraphine Louis in his life and he in hers. The film won seven César Awards, including Best Film.

== Works from the collection of Wilhelm Uhde ==
Jean Metzinger, 1906, La danse (Bacchante), oil on canvas, 73 x 54 cm. Last known location Kröller-Müller Museum, Otterlo, Netherlands

Georges Braque, 1909–10, La guitare (Mandora, La Mandore), oil on canvas, 71.1 x 55.9 cm, Tate Modern, London

Georges Braque, 1911–12, Figure, L'homme à la guitare (Man with a Guitar), oil on canvas, 116.2 x 80.9 cm (45.75 x 31.9 in), Museum of Modern Art, New York

Georges Braque, 1913, Nature morte (Fruit Dish, Ace of Clubs), oil, gouache and charcoal on canvas, 81 x 60 cm (31.8 x 23.6 in), Musée National d'Art Moderne, Centre Georges Pompidou, Paris

Pablo Picasso, 1909, Buste de femme (Femme en vert, Femme assise), oil on canvas, 100.3 x 81.3 cm, Van Abbemuseum, Netherlands

Pablo Picasso, 1909–10, Figure dans un Fauteuil (Seated Nude, Femme nue assise), oil on canvas, 92.1 x 73 cm, Tate Modern, London

Pablo Picasso, 1910, La Joueuse de Mandoline (Girl with a Mandolin, Fanny Tellier), oil on canvas, 100.3 x 73.6 cm, Museum of Modern Art, New York

Pablo Picasso, 1911–12, Violon (Violin), oil on canvas, 100 x 73 cm (oval), Kröller-Müller Museum, Otterlo, Netherlands

Pablo Picasso, 1913, Bouteille, clarinette, violon, journal, verre, 55 x 45 cm

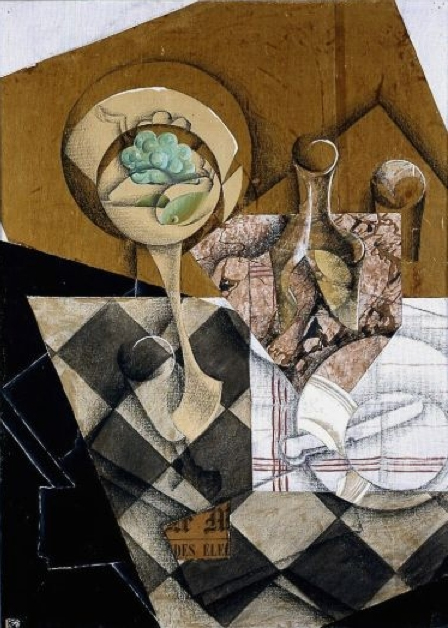
Juan Gris, 1914, Le Compotier (The Fruit Bowl), chalk and oil on canvas, 92 x 65 cm, Kröller-Müller Museum, Otterlo, Netherlands

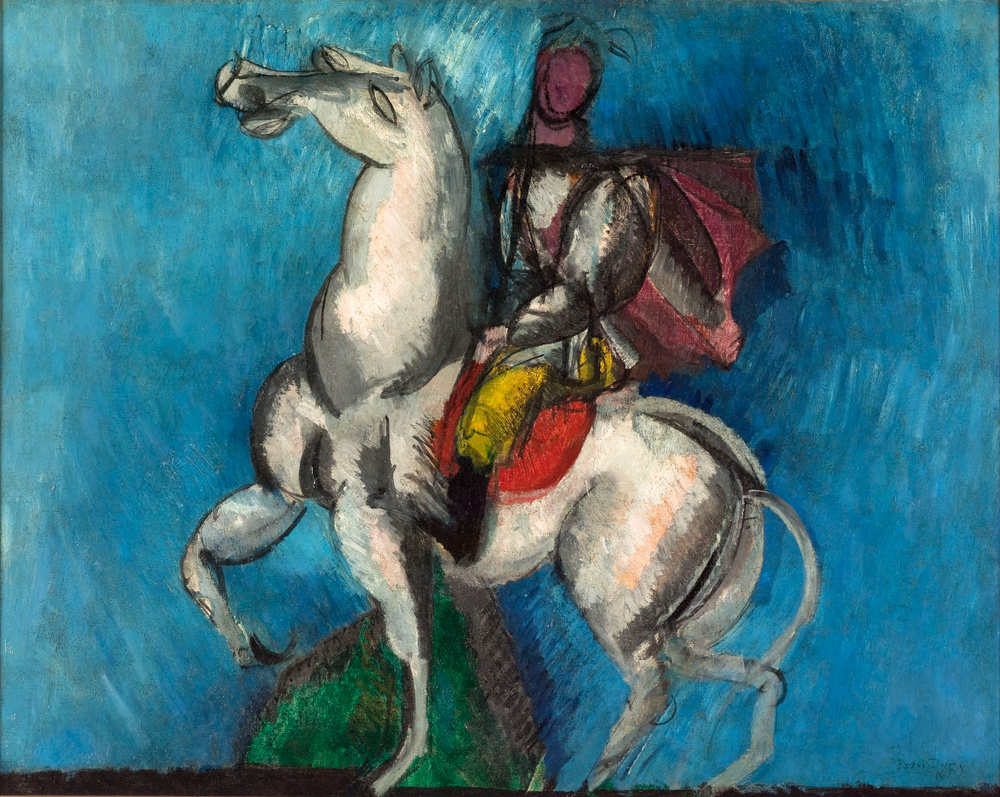
Raoul Dufy, 1914, Le Cavalier arabe (Le Cavalier blanc), oil on canvas, 66 x 81 cm, Musée d'Art Moderne de la Ville de Paris

Auguste Herbin, 1911, Le pont de fer (Iron Bridge), oil on canvas, 63.5 x 80 cm

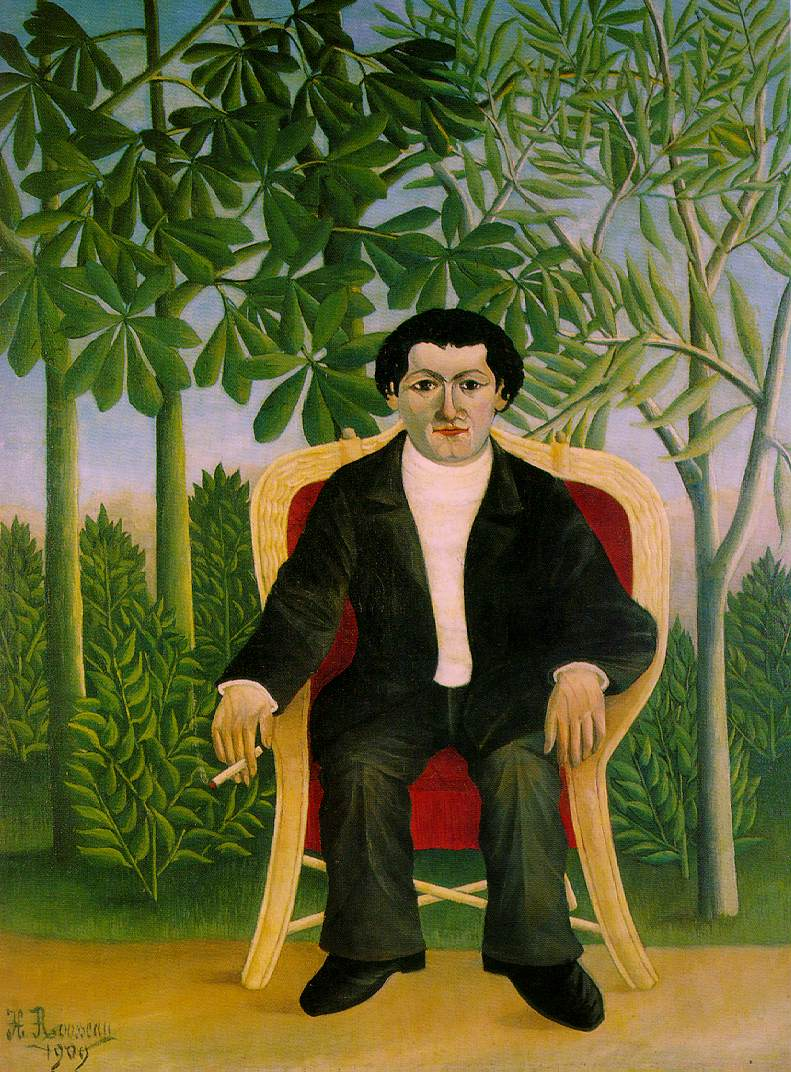
Henri Rousseau, 1909, Portrait of Joseph Brummer, oil on canvas, 116 x 88.5 cm (45.7 x 34.8 in), private collection

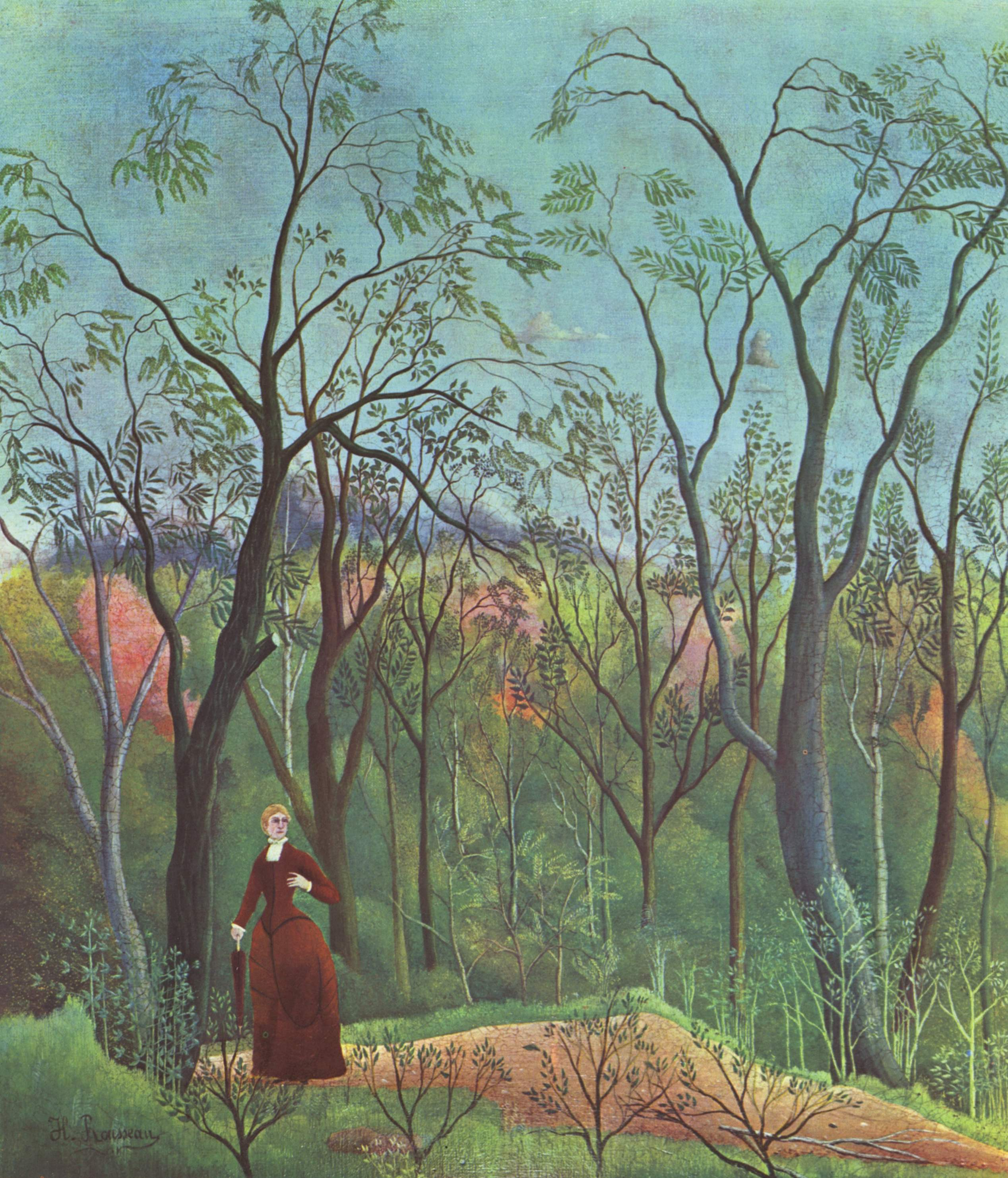
Henri Rousseau, 1886, La Femme en rouge dans le forêt (Am Waldrand), oil on canvas, 70 x 60.5 cm, Kunsthaus Zürich
