= Musée d'art naïf de Vicq en Île-de-France =

Art museum

Coordinates: 48°48′53″N 1°49′57″E

The Musée d'art naïf de Vicq en Île-de-France, formerly known as the International Museum of Naive Art (French: Musée International d'Art Naïf), was opened in 1973, located at 15, rue de la Mairie, in the village of Vicq, 25 km from Versailles at the centre of the Yvelines département in France. The museum is a non-profit organisation.

The museum is housed in the former home of Max Fourny and his wife Françoise Adnet, the figurative painter. The paintings are from Max Fourny's own collection as well as other collections.

Owned by the village since 1997, the museum was formerly operated by the MIDAN association from 2001 to 2014, and has been closed since 2014.

== See also ==
- Musée d'Art Naïf - Max Fourny, Paris
- Naïve art
