= Camille Bombois =

French painter

Camille Bombois (3 February 1883 – 6 June 1970) was a French naïve painter especially noted for paintings of circus scenes.

Bombois was born in Venarey-les-Laumes in the Côte-d'Or, in humble circumstances. His childhood was spent living on a barge and attending a local school until the age of twelve, when he became a farm worker. During his free time he drew and competed in wrestling competitions at local fairs. He became a champion local wrestler before joining a traveling circus as a strongman and wrestler.

In 1907, Bombois fulfilled his dream of moving to Paris, where he married and worked as a railway laborer, eventually finding a night job at a newspaper printing plant handling heavy newsprint rolls. Despite the exhausting nature of his job he painted from dawn to dusk, sleeping little. He showed his paintings in sidewalk exhibitions, but his earliest paintings, revealing the influence of the old masters in their subdued use of color, attracted few buyers.

1914 marked the beginning of four-and-a-half years of military service in World War I. Bombois spent much of it on the front line, earning three decorations for bravery. Upon his return home, encouraged that his wife had succeeded in selling a number of his paintings in his absence, he resumed his routine of night labor and daytime painting. In 1922, his sidewalk displays in Montmartre began attracting the attention of collectors. The art dealer Wilhelm Uhde "discovered" him in 1924, and exhibited Bombois' work in the Galeries des Quatre Chemins in 1927. In 1937, his works were shown in the exhibition "Maîtres populaires de la réalité" in Paris. His first solo show was in 1944 at the Galerie Pétridès. Critics compared Bombois' work to that of Henri Rousseau, which it resembled in its naïve drawing, crisp delineation of form, and attention to detail, although Bombois was less of a fantasist than Rousseau.

The paintings of his maturity are bold in color, featuring strong contrasts of black, bright reds, blues and electric pinks. Drawing from his own experiences, he often painted circus performers and landscapes with fishermen. His paintings of women are emphatic in their carnality, and his landscapes are notable in their careful attention to space, and to the effects of reflected light on water. Bombois' works are on view in many public collections, notably the Musée Maillol in Paris and the Zander Collection in Cologne.

In 2023, Bavarian town of Passau in Germany restituted a painting by Bombois that had been looted from Jewish collector Marcel Joseph Monteux, who was murdered in Auschwitz-Birkenau concentration camp on August 15, 1944.

== Exhibitions ==
- Exhibition 01. André Bauchant | Camille Bombois | Séraphine Louis | Henri Rousseau | Louis Vivin. Zander Collection, Cologne (25. November 2023 – 24. April 2024)
- Welche Moderne? In- und Outsider der Avantgarde. Sprengel Museum Hannover, Hanover (6. May 2023 – 17. September 2023), Kunstsammlungen Chemnitz, Chemnitz (22. October 2023 – 14. January 2024)
- Die Maler des Heiligen Herzens. Museum Frieder Burda, Baden-Baden (16. July 2022 – 20. November 2022), Museen Böttcherstraße, Bremen (3. December 2022 – 12. March 2023)
- Du Dounier Rousseau à Seraphine. Le grands maître naïfs. Musée Maillol, Paris (11. September 2019 – 23. February 2020)
- Outliers and American Vanguard Art. National Gallery, Washington D.C. (28. January 2018 – 13. Mai 2018), High Museum of Art, Atlanta (24. June 2018 – 30. September 2018), Los Angeles County Museum of Art, Los Angeles (18. November 2018 – 18. March 2019)
- 27 Artists, 209 Works. Zander Collection, Bönnigheim (23. March – 28. August 2016)
- Der Schatten der Avantgarde. Rousseau und die vergessenen Maler. Folkwang Museum, Essen (2. October 2015 – 10. January 2016)
- Die Clowns des Camille Bombois. Museum Charlotte Zander, Bönnigheim (30. May 1999 – 24. October 1999)
- Die Kunst der Naiven. Themen und Beziehungen. Haus der Kunst, Munich (1. November 1974 – 12. January 1975), Kunsthaus Zürich, Zürich (25. Januar 1975 – 31. März 1975)
- documenta. Kunst des XX. Jahrhunderts. Internationale Ausstellung, Museum Fridericianum, Kassel (16. July 1955 – 18. September 1955)
- Masters of Popular Painting. Modern Primitives of Europe and America. Museum of Modern Art, New York (27. April – 24. July 1938)
- Les Peintres du cœur sacré, Galerie des Quatres Chemins, Paris (8. June – 21. June 1928)
