= Louis Vivin =

French painter (1861–1936)

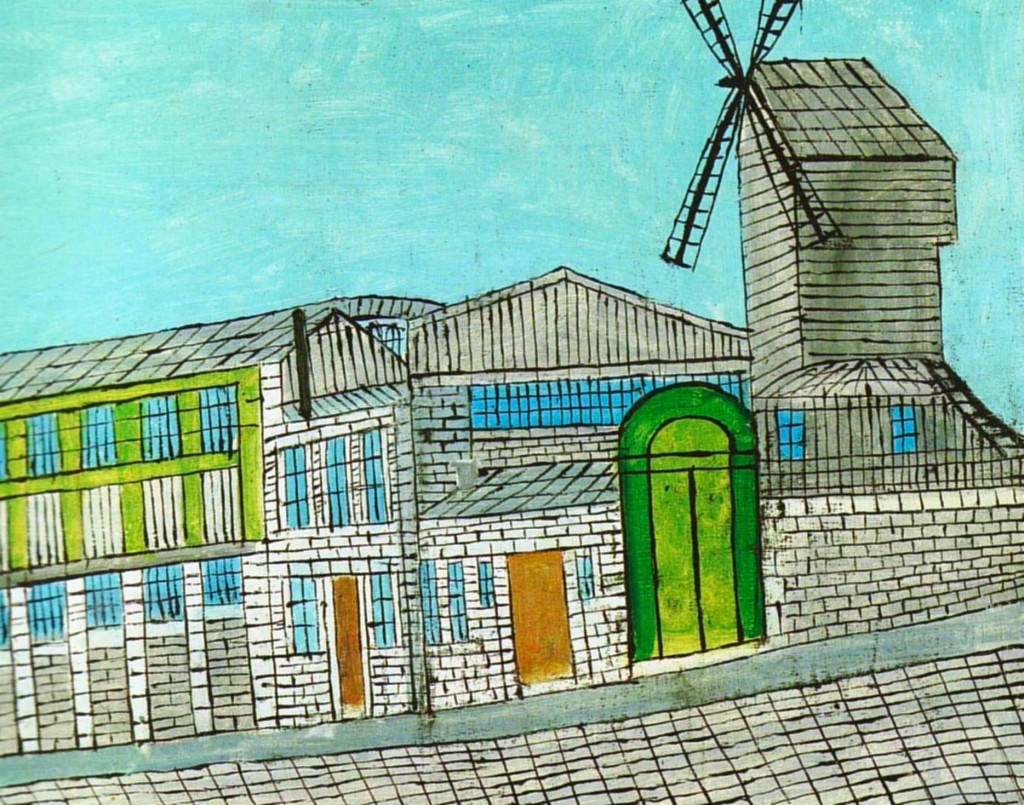
Vivin's Le Moulin de la Galette, oil on canvas, 1926

Louis Vivin (28 July 1861 – 28 May 1936) was a French primitivist painter.

== Biography ==
Vivin was born in Hadol, France. He showed great enthusiasm for painting as a child, but his career took him in a completely different direction: until 1922 he worked for the mobile branch of the French postal service – "travel[ing] about the country a good deal, but always in a windowless railway mail car, lighted from above and walled by tiers of pigeonholes" – pursuing his art only in his spare hours. During this time he produced a series of maps showing the location of each post office in every postal district of France; this won him two years' seniority, the rank of inspector and the ribbon of the Palmes académiques, but the postal authorities decided that it would be too expensive to have the maps printed.

In 1889 he moved to Paris, where he lived with his wife in a small fifth-floor flat – two rooms and kitchen – in the district of Montmartre. He visited the Louvre and the Musée du Luxembourg: "The old masters left him unimpressed, but he liked Corot and Courbet, and fell in love with Meissonier. One night he had a vision: Meissonier appeared in a dream and told him that he could be a great artist if he tried."

Once he retired, on a pension, in 1923, Vivin finally became a full-time artist.

He was self-taught and a representative of naïve painting. Eventually, he was discovered by the German art critic Wilhelm Uhde (1874–1947), an association which helped him start exhibiting and build a reputation as a serious artist.

Towards the end of his life he had a stroke, followed by another, which affected his speech and left him unable to paint. He died in Paris, aged 75, on 28 May 1936, and was buried in the Cimetière parisien de Pantin.

== Works ==
The subjects of Vivin's paintings were still life, hunting subjects, and the city of Paris, and "illustrated books, magazine, loose flower prints, [and] chromolithographed picture postcards" were his models. He was also known for painting from his memory. Vivin was a contemporary of Henri Rousseau, Camille Bombois, André Bauchant, and Séraphine Louis, known collectively as the "Sacred Heart Painters" and as masters of French naïve painting. Vivin was influenced by the work and details of Jean-Louis-Ernest Meissonier’s paintings. His works depicted genre scenes, flower pieces, hunting scenes and views of Paris, "notable for their charmingly wobbly perspective effects".

Louis Vivin’s first one-man exhibition was placed at the Galerie des Quatre Chemins, and it was organized by Wilhelm Uhde in 1927. His work is noted for its melancholy mood, although this is less pronounced in his later work, which focused more on blocks of color and form.

== Lists of his selected artworks ==
Southampton City Art Gallery

- Venice: Canal Scene with a Church
- La main chaude
- Les Invalides
- Venice: Canal Scene with a Bridge

Auction Christie's

- La place des Halles et l'eglise Saint-eustache, Paris, 1935
- Sacre coeur
- Vue de sacre coeur

Private collections

- Casino de Biarritz
- The Flower Market, 1914
- Gare Montparnasse, Paris
- Luncheon on the Grass, 1925
- Paris, Eglise de la Trinité, 1925
- Paris, Montmartre: Cirque Medrano, 1925
