= Musée d'Art Naïf – Max Fourny =

Museum of naive art in Paris, France

Coordinates: 48°53′5″N 2°20′40″E

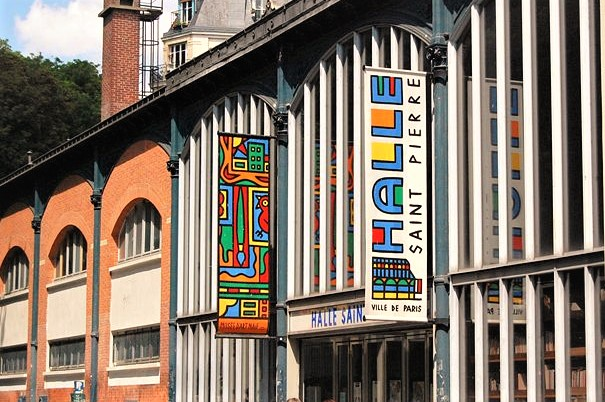
Musée d'Art Naïf – Max Fourny

The Musée d'Art Naïf – Max Fourny (Museum of Naïve Art–Max Fourny), also known as the Musée d'Art Brut & Art Singulier (Museum of Primitive Art and Singular Art), is a museum of naive art located in the Halle Saint-Pierre at 2, rue Ronsard, in the 18th arrondissement of Paris, France. The closest Paris Métro stations are Anvers on Line 2, and Abbesses on Line 12. It is open daily (closed on weekends in August); an admission fee is charged.

The museum was established in 1986 by publisher Max Fourny, in former market built in 1868 at the base of Montmartre. It presents temporary exhibitions of folk art, naive art, and outsider art. In 2008, its permanent collection held 629 works including 516 paintings, 13 works on paper, marquetry, 11 textile works, and 47 set under glass.

== See also ==
- List of museums in Paris
- International Museum of Naive Art
