= André Bauchant =

French painter

André Bauchant (April 24, 1873 – August 12, 1958) was a French painter. His paintings are mostly influenced by historical, mythological and religious themes, landscapes and nature.

== Biography ==
André Bauchant was born in Château-Renault, Indre-et-Loire. The son of a gardener, he originally entered his father's trade, and progressed to operating a nursery. In 1914, he was called to serve in World War I. During the military service his drawing skills were noticed and he was trained as a mapmaker. After demobilization in 1919 he found his nurseries destroyed. He and his wife relocated to Auzouer-en-Touraine, where he found work on local farms. Inspired by the rural environment, at the age of 45, he dedicated himself to a career as a painter.

Many of his early works depict biblical or mythological themes. His first exhibit was in 1921 at the Salon d'Automne, where he showed a large Ulysses and the Sirens and eight other paintings. Le Corbusier and Amédée Ozenfant wrote an article about him for the journal L'Esprit Nouveau in 1922, and Le Corbusier became an important collector of his work. In 1927 Bauchant was commissioned by Diaghilev to design sets for Stravinsky's Apollon Musagète.

Subsequently, Bauchant's most frequent subjects were floral still lifes and landscapes with figures. The German art dealer and gallery owner Wilhelm Uhde exhibited works by Bauchant in his Galerie des Quatre Chemins in Paris in 1928 in the exhibition Les Peintres du cœur sacré together with works by Camille Bombois, Séraphine Louis, Henri Rousseau and Louis Vivin. In 1937 his paintings were included in the exhibition Maîtres Populaires de la Réalité, which traveled to Paris, Zurich, and London. In 1938–1939, a version of the same exhibition was presented at eight US museums, beginning with the Museum of Modern Art in New York. In 1949, a retrospective exhibition of 215 of his works was mounted by the Galerie Charpentier in Paris.

According to the art historian Nadine Pouillon, "Bauchant's treatment of figures, frozen in attitudes indicating a certain awkwardness and as if enshrined in foliage, manifest a poetic and mysterious quality sometimes reminiscent of medieval paintings. This association was further emphasized by his use of unglazed colours in the manner of quattrocento frescoes and by a colour sense similar to that of Giotto."

Works by Bauchant are now part of the collection of the Museum of Modern Art in New York, the Tate Gallery in London and the Zander Collection in Cologne.

== Exhibitions (selection) ==
- Exhibition 01. André Bauchant | Camille Bombois | Séraphine Louis | Henri Rousseau | Louis Vivin. Zander Collection, Cologne (25.11.2023–24.4.2024)
- Welche Moderne? In- und Outsider der Avantgarde. Sprengel Museum Hannover, Hanover (6.5.2023–17.9.2023), Kunstsammlungen Chemnitz, Chemnitz (22.10.2023–14.1.2024)
- Die Maler des Heiligen Herzens. Museum Frieder Burda, Baden-Baden (16.7.2022–20.11.2022), Museen Böttcherstraße, Bremen (3.12.2022–12.3.2023)
- Du Dounier Rousseau à Seraphine. Le grands maître naïfs. Musée Maillol, Paris (11.9.2019–23.2.2020)
- 27 Artists, 209 Works. Zander Collection, Bönnigheim (23.3.–28.8.2016)
- Der Schatten der Avantgarde. Rousseau und die vergessenen Maler. Folkwang Museum, Essen (2.10.2015–10.1.2016)
- André Bauchant (1873–1958). Maler und Gärtner. Retrospektive. Museum Charlotte Zander, Bönnigheim (4.2.2001–24.6.2001)
- André Bauchant. Musée Maillol, Paris (9.3.1995–15.10.1995)
- Die Kunst der Naiven. Themen und Beziehungen. Haus der Kunst, Munich (1.11.1974–12.1.1975), Kunsthaus Zürich, Zurich (25.1.1975–31.3.1975)
- André Bauchant. Stedelijk Museum, Amsterdam (5.1949–6.1949)
- André Bauchant. Galerie Charpentier, Paris (1949)
- Masters of Popular Painting. Modern Primitives of Europe and America. Museum of Modern Art, New York (27.4.–24.7.1938)
- André Bauchant, Galerie Jeanne Bucher, Paris (21.12.1927–6.1.1928)
- Les Peintres du cœur sacré. Galerie des Quatres Chemins, Paris (8.6.–21.6.1928)
- Salon d'Automne. Grand Palais, Paris (1921 – 1928)

== Bibliography ==
- Bihalji-Merin, Oto (1959). Modern Primitives: Masters of Naive Painting. trans. Norbert Guterman. New York: Harry N. Abrams. p. 265.
- Zander, Charlotte (1996). Die Maler des heiligen Herzens. Bönnigheim: WachterVerlag.
- Zander, Charlotte (2000). André Bauchant. Heidelberg: Edition Braus.
- Brettell, Richard R., Paul Hayes Tucker, and Natalie Henderson Lee (2009). Nineteenth- and Twentieth-century Paintings. New York: The Metropolitan Museum of Art. ISBN 9781588393494.
- Vierny, Dina, Cabana, Pierre (2009). André Bauchant. Catalogue Raisonné. Wabern: Benteli.
- Pouillon, Nadine. "Bauchant, André." Grove Art Online. Oxford Art Online. Oxford University Press. Web.
- Zander, Susanne (2023). 26 Artists. Works from the Zander Collection. Cologne: Verlag der Buchhandlung Walther und Franz König. p. 7.
