= Helmut Kolle =

German painter (1899–1931)

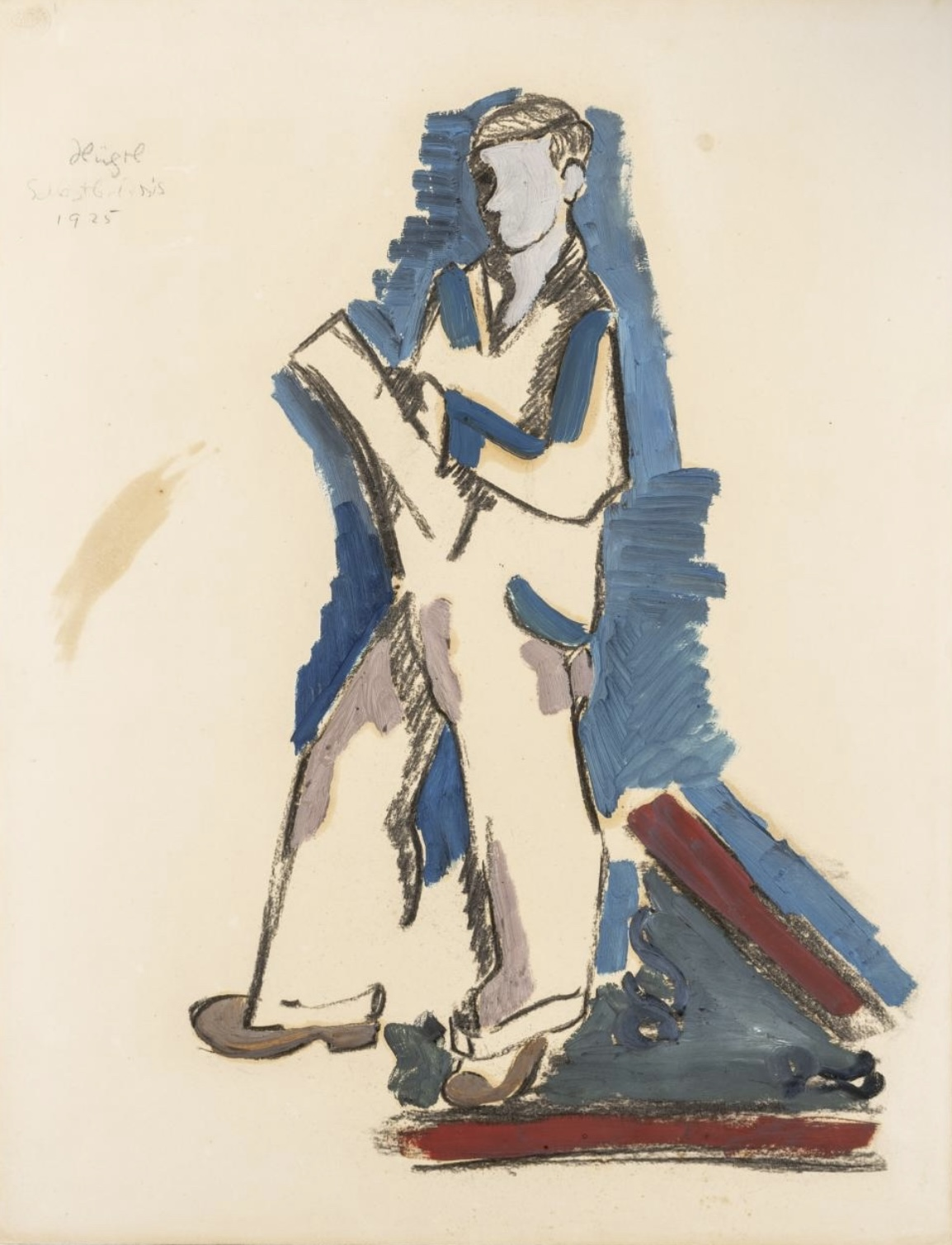
- Self portrait (with sketchbook) c. 1925
- Born: 24 February 1899; Berlin-Charlottenburg, Germany
- Died: 17 November 1931 (aged 32); Chantilly, Oise, France
- Resting place: Cimetière du Bois de Bourillon, Chantilly, France; 49°11′20″N 2°27′48″E
- Education: Erna Pinner
- Known for: Painting, Writing
- Patrons: Wilhelm Uhde

Helmut Kolle (24 February 1899 – 17 November 1931) was a German painter who found major success in France in the 1920s, fusing the German modernist style with that of French painting.

Kolle was born in Berlin-Charlottenburg, the second son of the noted bacteriologist Wilhelm Kolle (1868–1935) and Helene Alwine Brigl. His father initially worked at Robert Koch's Berlin institute (the Robert Koch Institute) and then relocated to Bern in Switzerland with his family in 1906. There Kolle also received some instruction in painting and drawing.

In 1917, the family moved to Frankfurt where Wilhelm Kolle became director of the Royal Institute for Experimental Therapy (now the Paul Ehrlich Institute). In 1918 Helmut Kolle met his business partner, lover, and mentor Wilhelm Uhde, an art collector, and moved with him to Weimar. After early experiences as a fledgling writer, Kolle shifted his focus more and more to painting, getting instruction from Erna Pinner in 1918/19, made possible by Uhde's connections in the art world.

In 1923, Uhde hosted the first show of Kolle's paintings at his art gallery in Berlin. In 1924, Kolle and Uhde moved to Paris, where Kolle was heavily influenced by the works of Pablo Picasso and Georges Braque. A very successful exhibition followed in 1925, which even had a poem by Jean Cocteau about one of the paintings in the catalog. At a 1926 exhibition, almost all paintings shown were also sold, and around this time Helmut Kolle began signing his paintings as "Kolle" instead of using his earlier pseudonym "Helmut vom Hügel" (which is a complex pun based on the fact that the Latin word colle, which sounds like Kolle, is the ablative of collis, "hill", and can mean "from the hill" when combined with an appropriate preposition—which then translates back to German as vom Hügel). In 1926, Uhde moved to Chantilly, where he was later joined by Kolle in 1928 when the latter's health deteriorated.

Kolle had been suffering from endocarditis since 1922. In the summer of 1931, his health problems got worse and he died in November that year. He was interred at the Cimetière du Bois de Bourillon in Chantilly.

Kolle's works, insofar as they depict people, tend to feature either males, often in various states of undress or slightly suggestive poses, either (in his earlier works) very feminine-looking boys or (later in his career) decidedly muscular men, the shift probably influenced by the ideals of masculinity as found in novels by Henry de Montherlant. Despite these fairly obvious homoerotic sentiments in his paintings, Kolle was notoriously guarded about his homosexuality and his relationship with Uhde, much different to the openness of other homosexual artists in France or Germany at the time, e.g. Klaus Mann.

After Kolle's death, major exhibitions of his works took place in Hamburg (1952 and 2011), Chemnitz (2010), and Munich (1994), in addition to numerous exhibitions in smaller European galleries. In England, Lucy Wertheim was the most important exponent of Kolle's œuvre, exhibiting Kolle's paintings in her London gallery in 1930, 1931, 1934, 1935, and 1938.

== Gallery ==
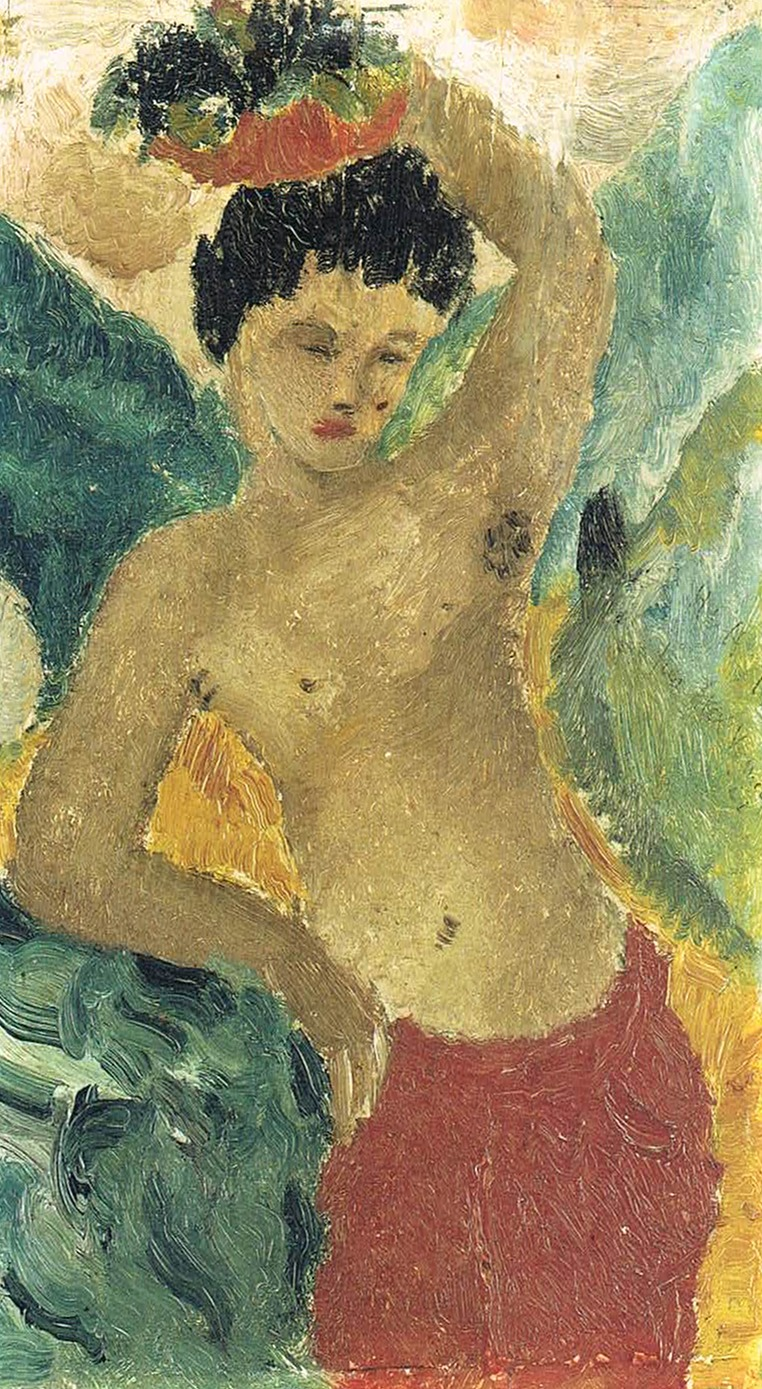
Boy with fruit basket, ca. 1922

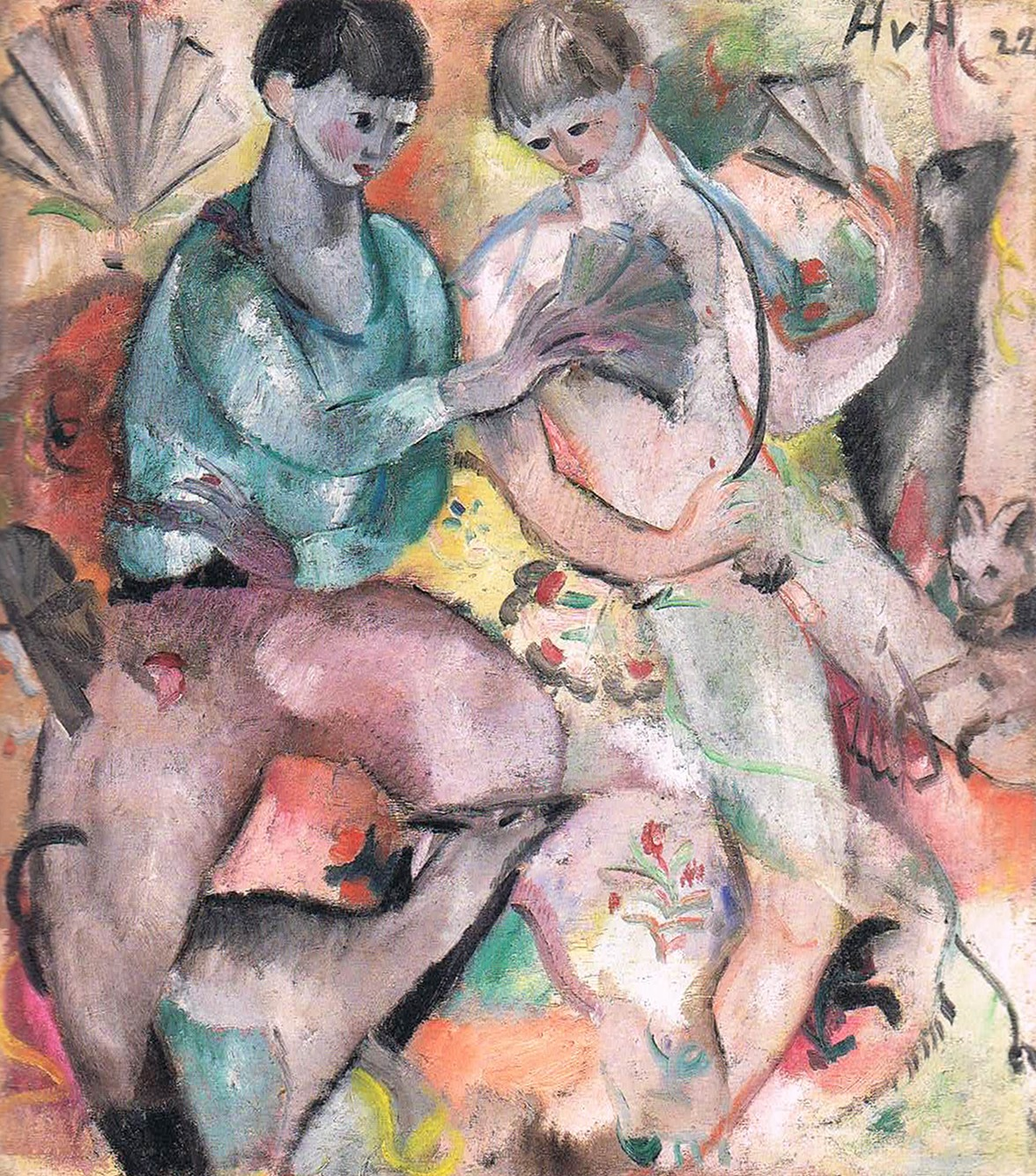
Boys with fans, 1922

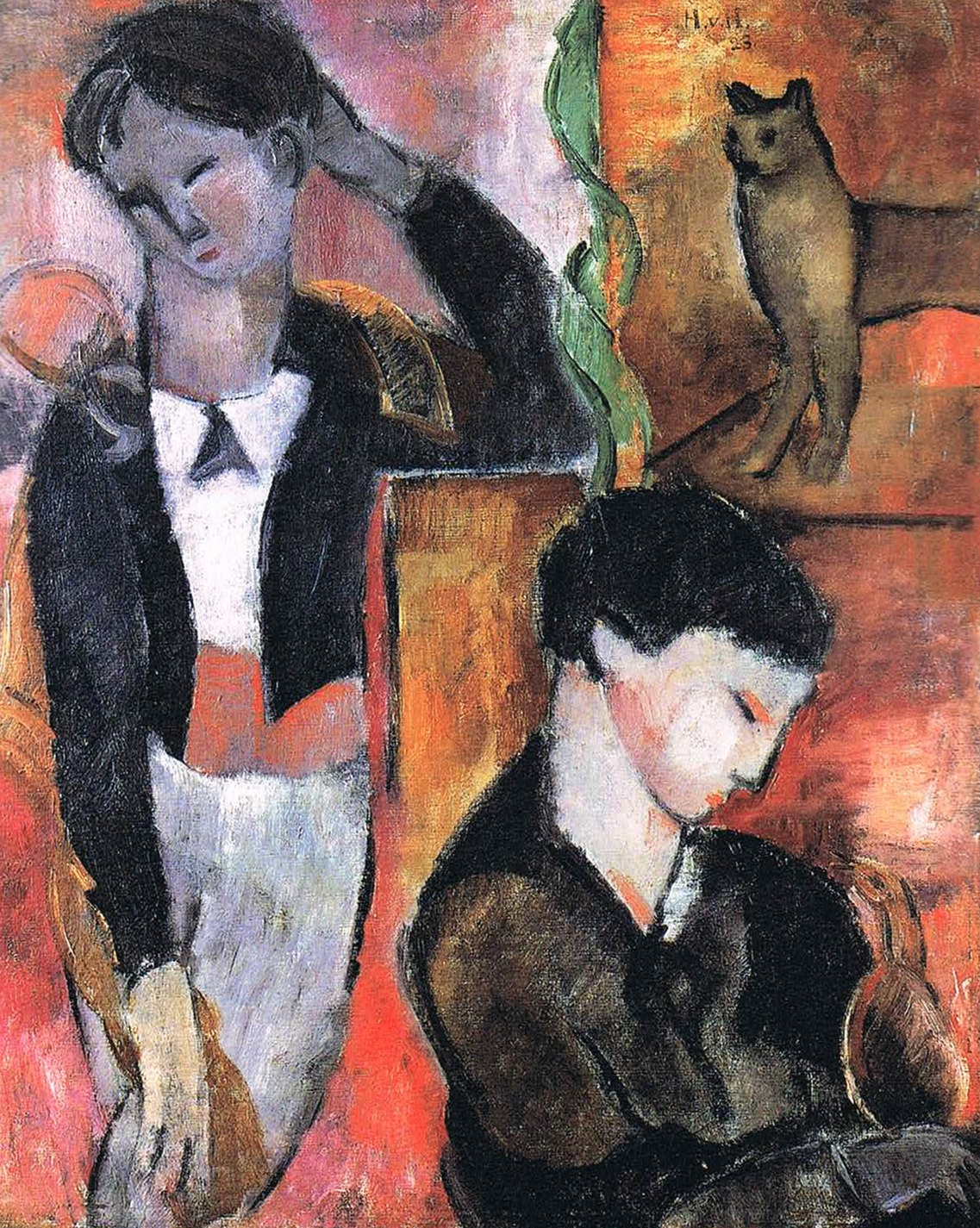
Two boys with a cat and a bird, 1923

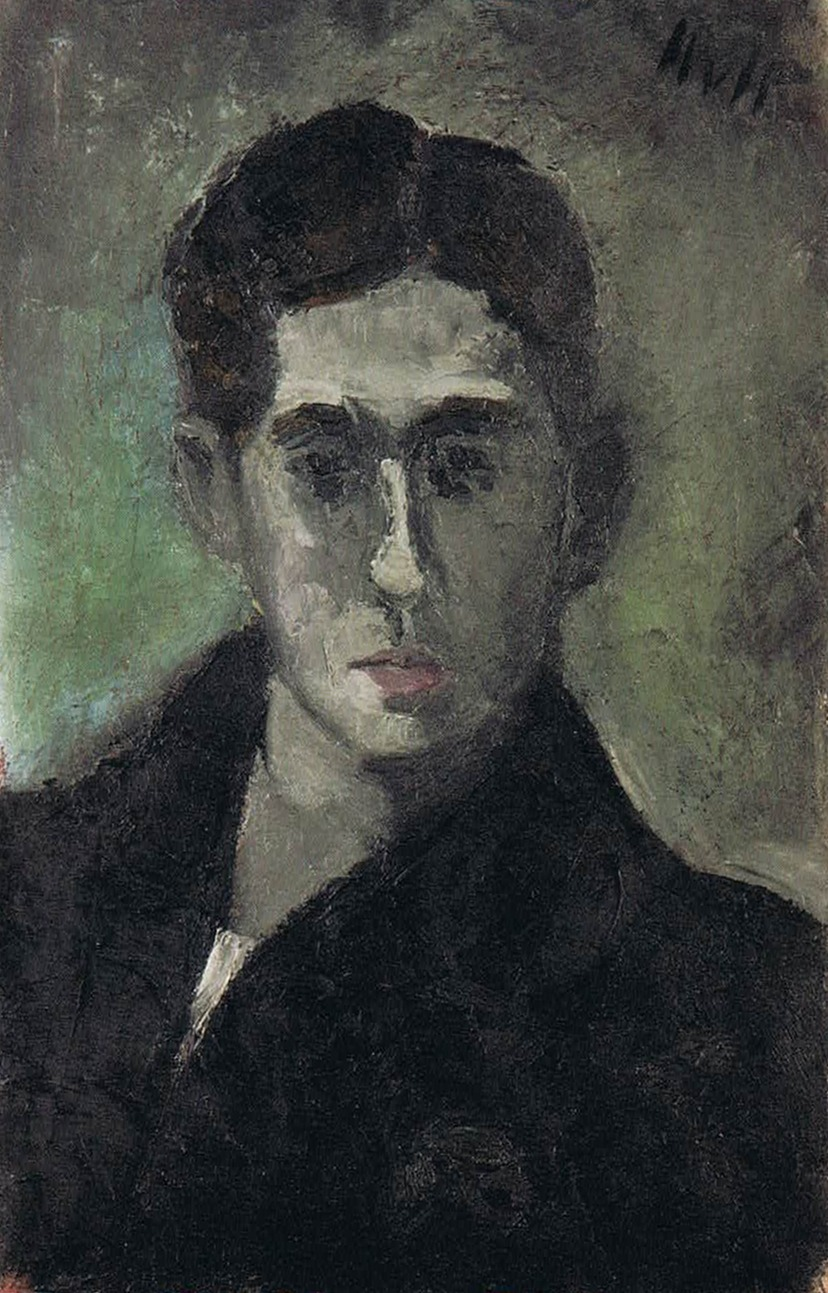
Self portrait, 1923

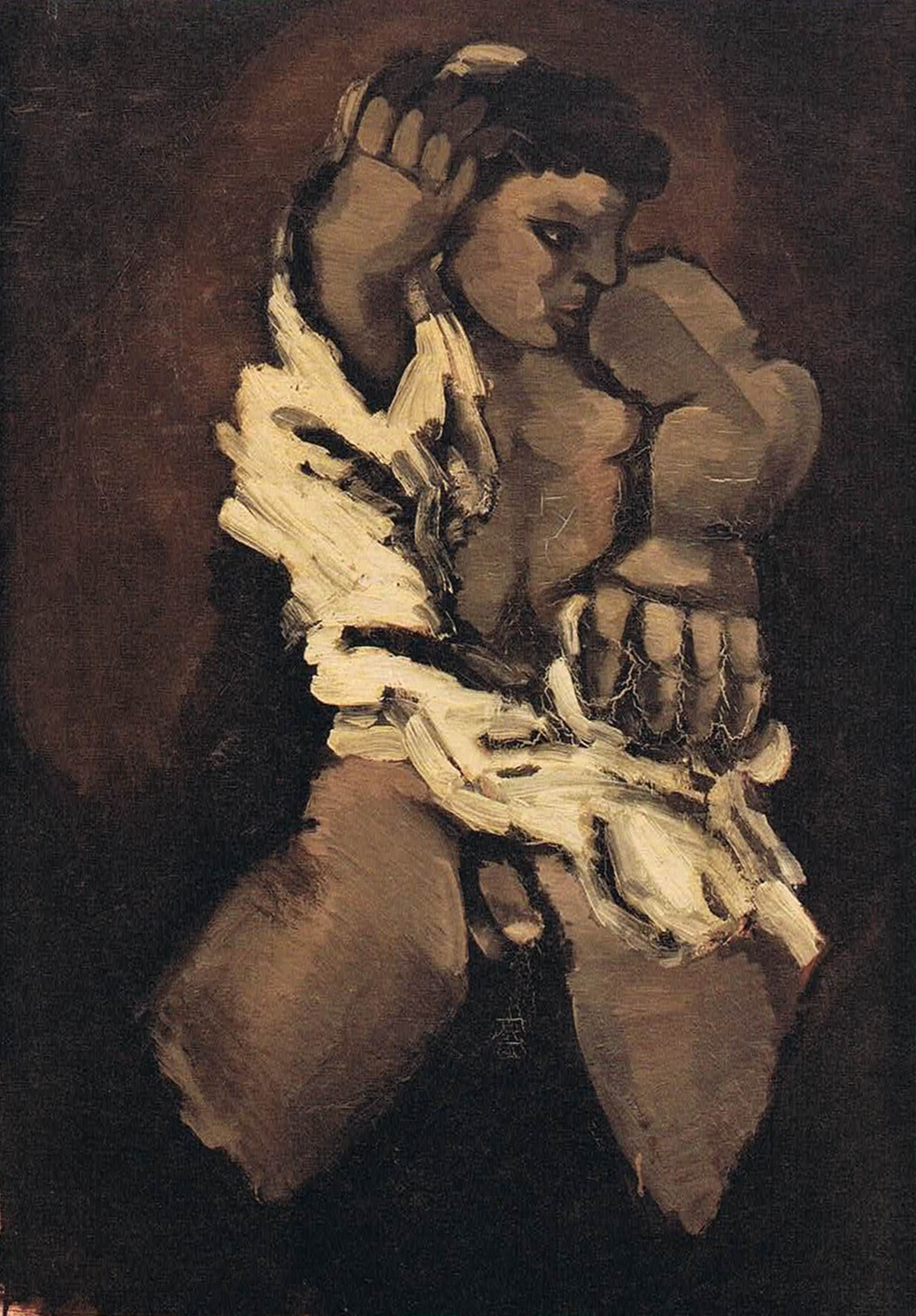
Boy putting on a shirt, 1924

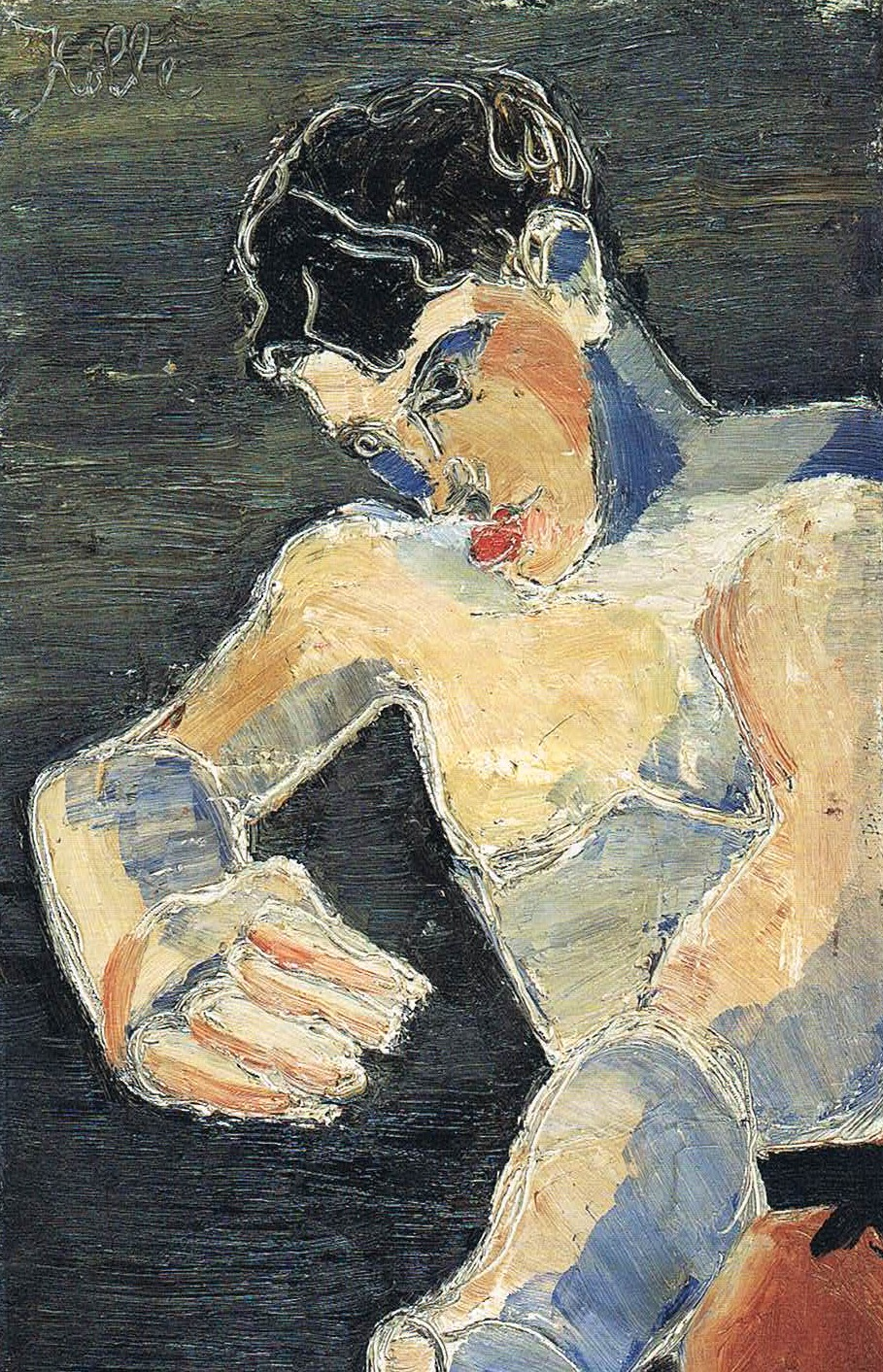
Young boxer (self portrait), 1925

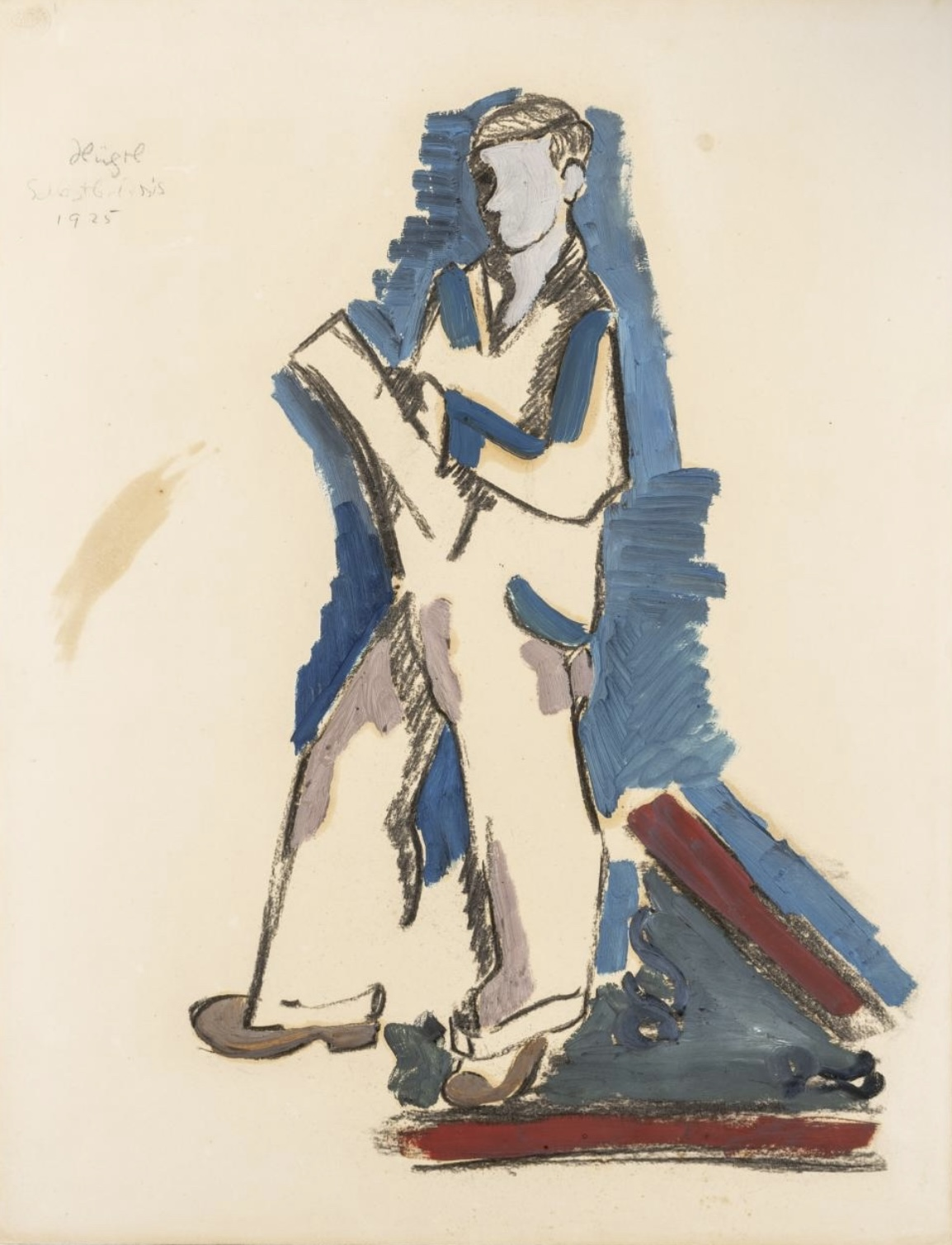
Selfportrait (with sketchbook), 1925

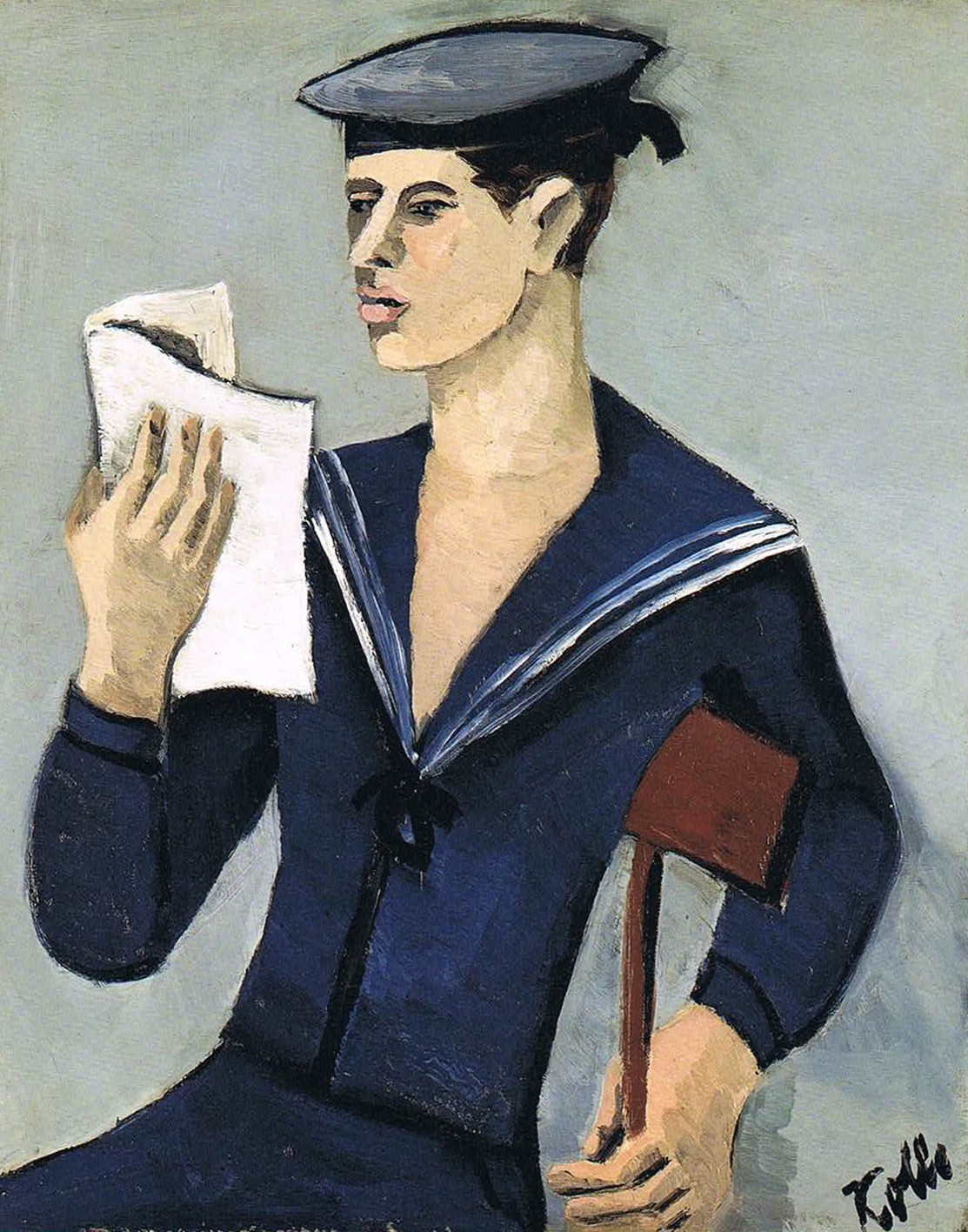
Reading sailor, 1926/1927

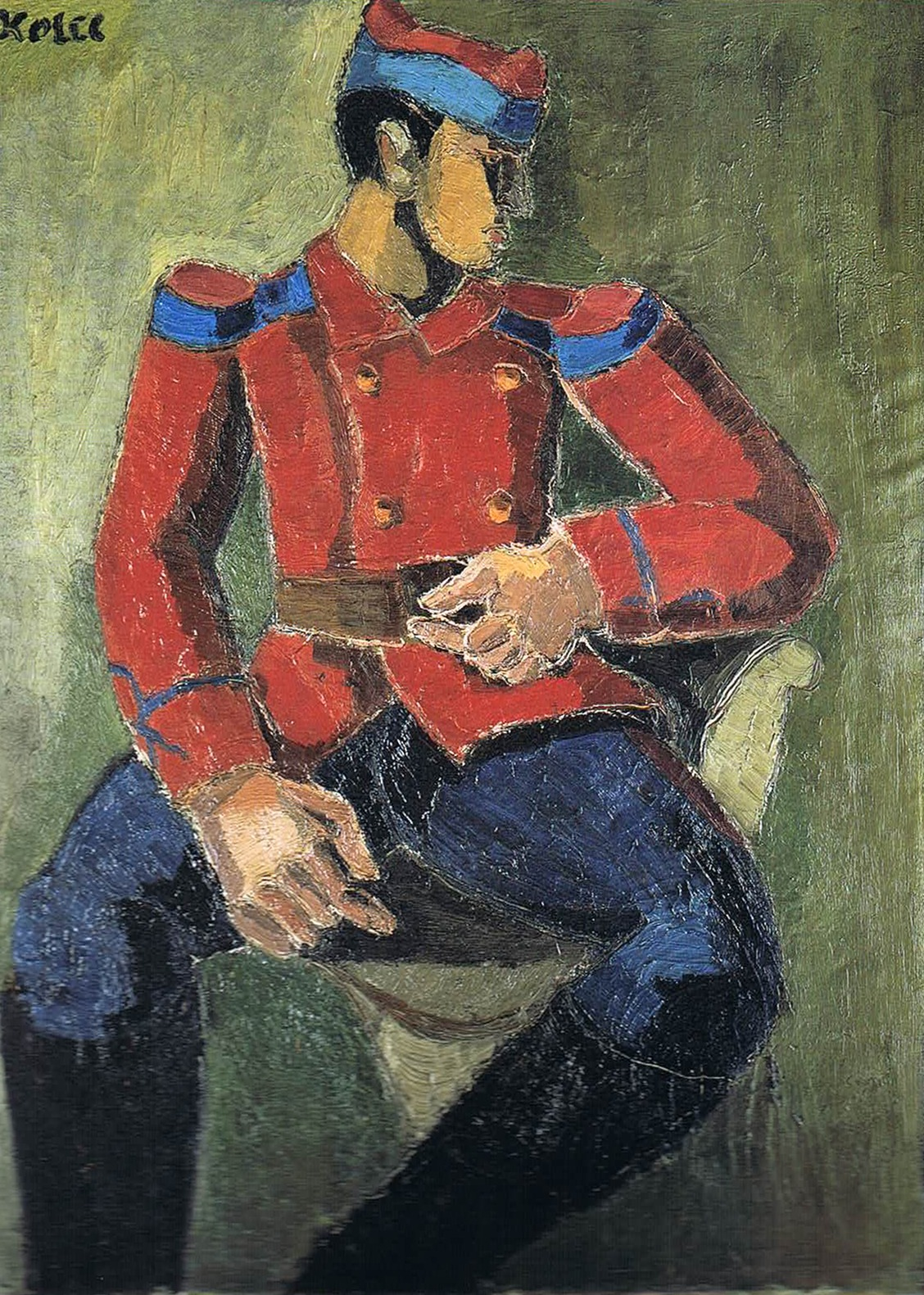
Sitting soldier, 1926/27

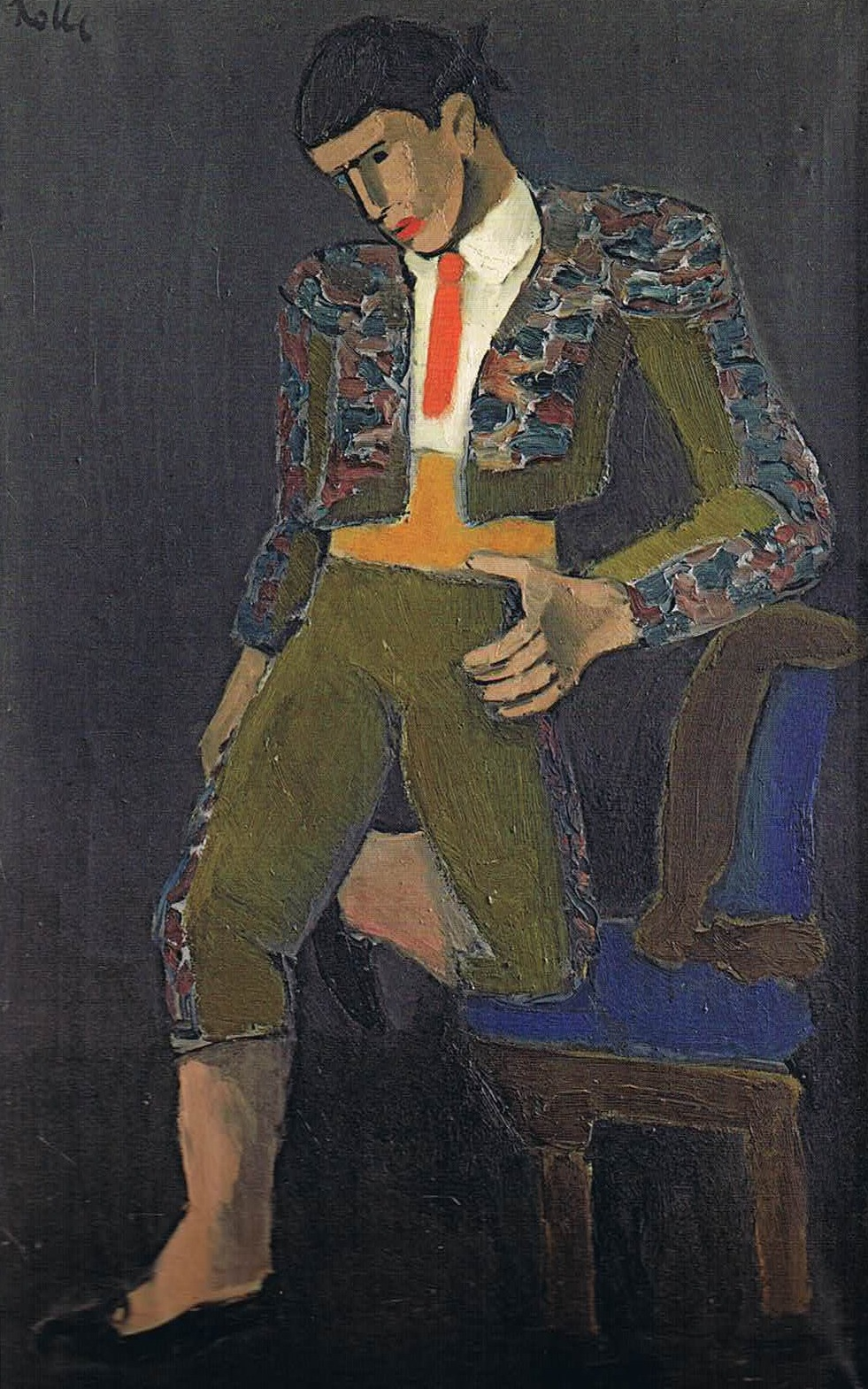
Torero leaning on a chair, ca. 1927

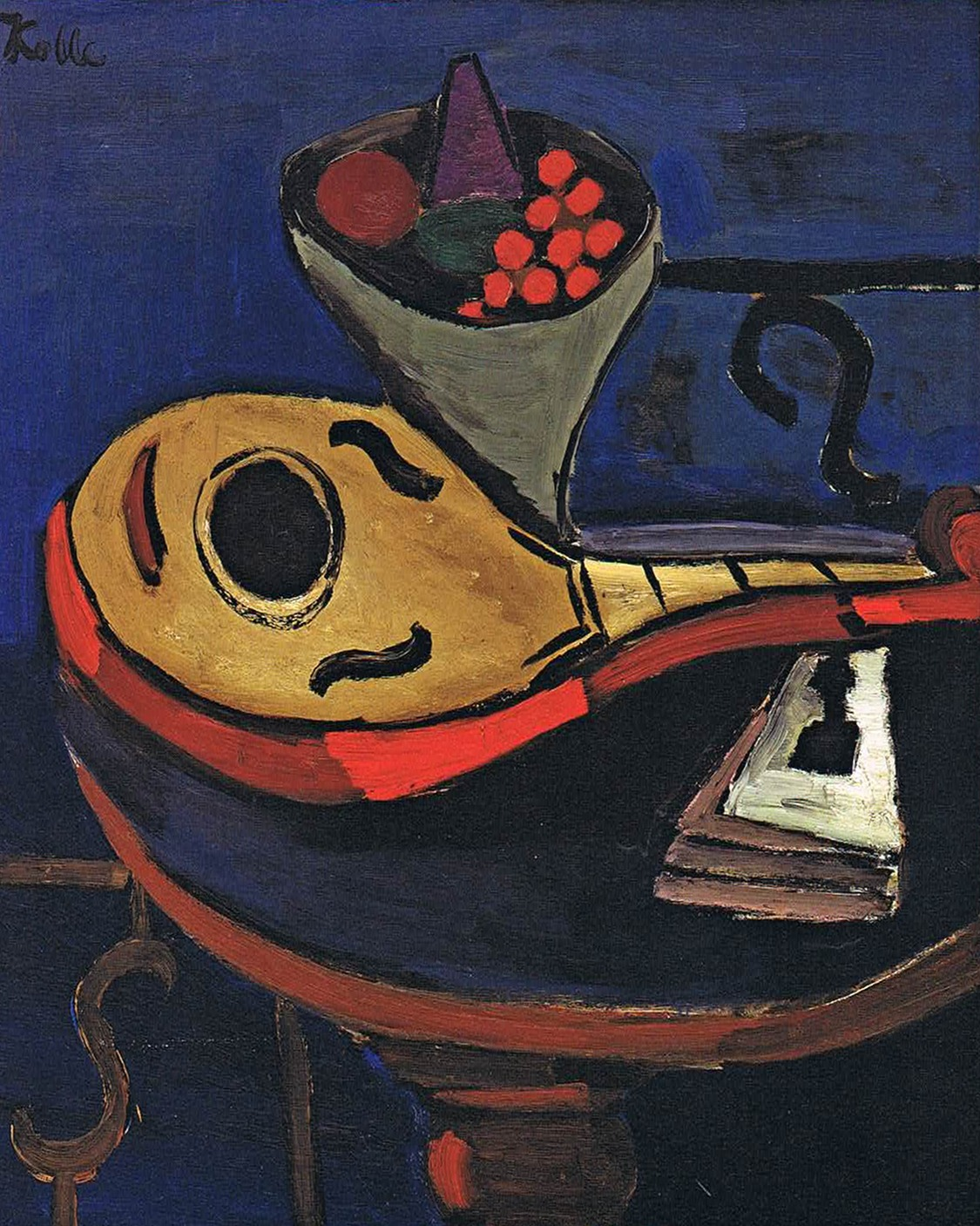
Mandolin and fruit bowl, ca. 1928–30

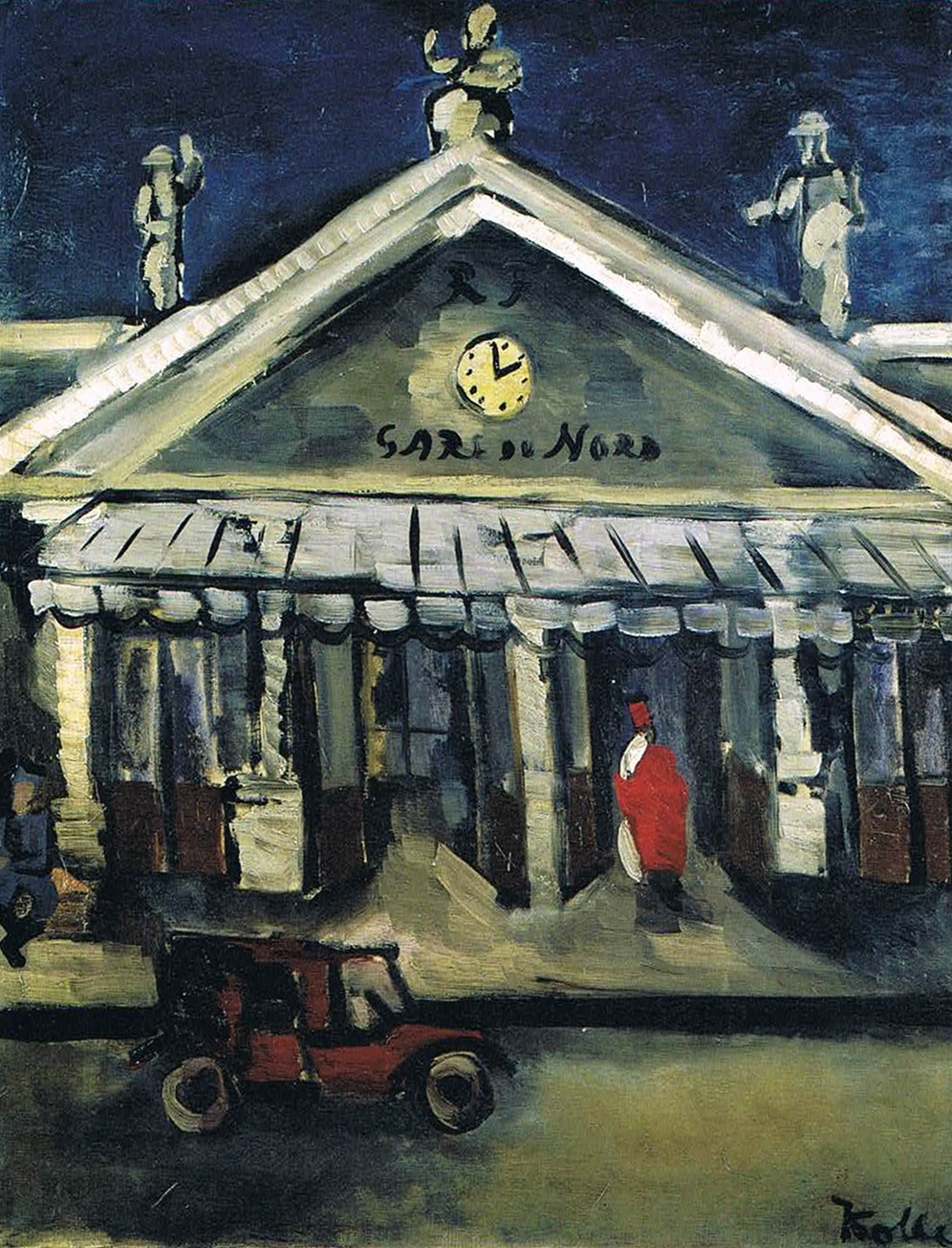
Gare du Nord, ca. 1929

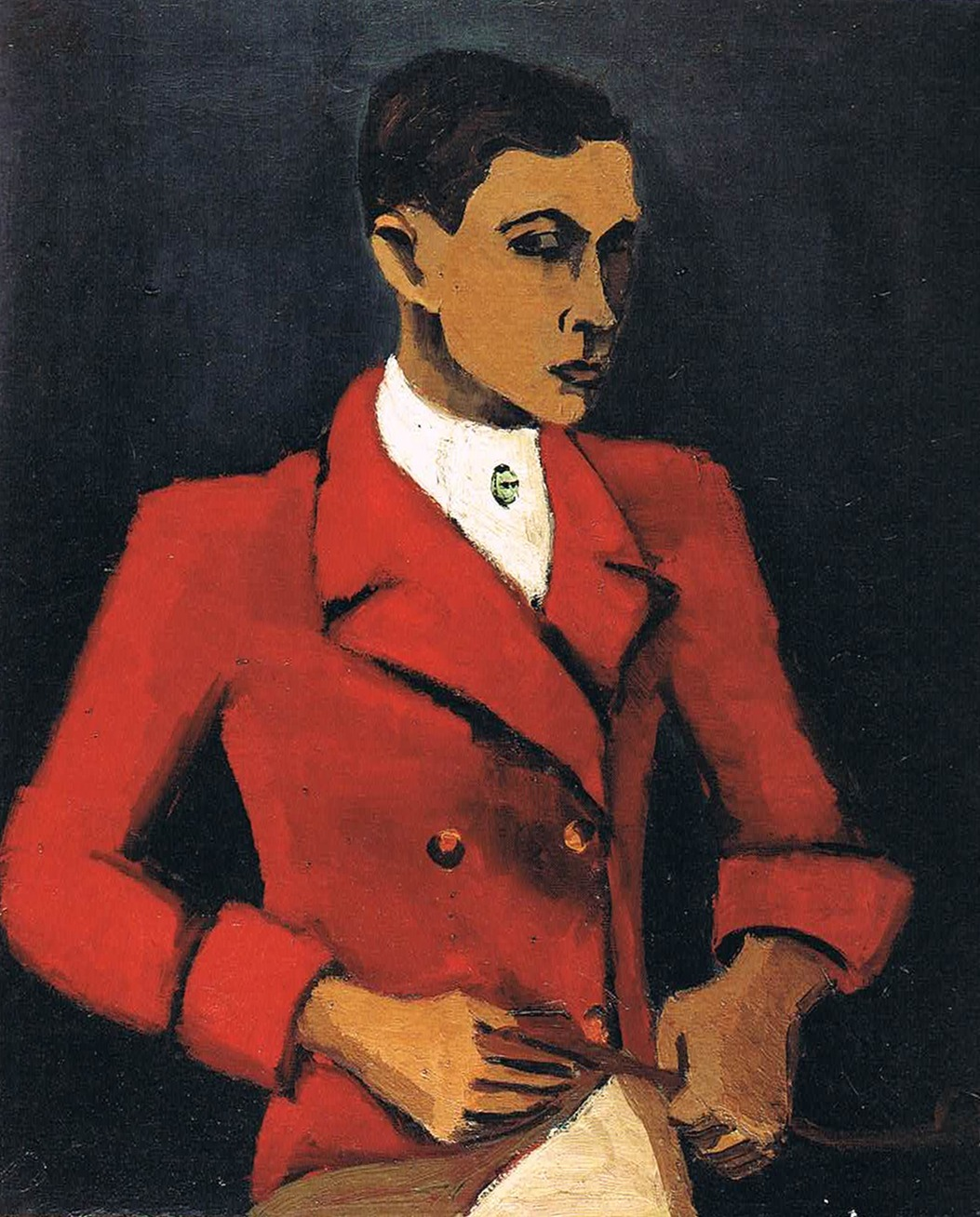
Self portrait, ca. 1930

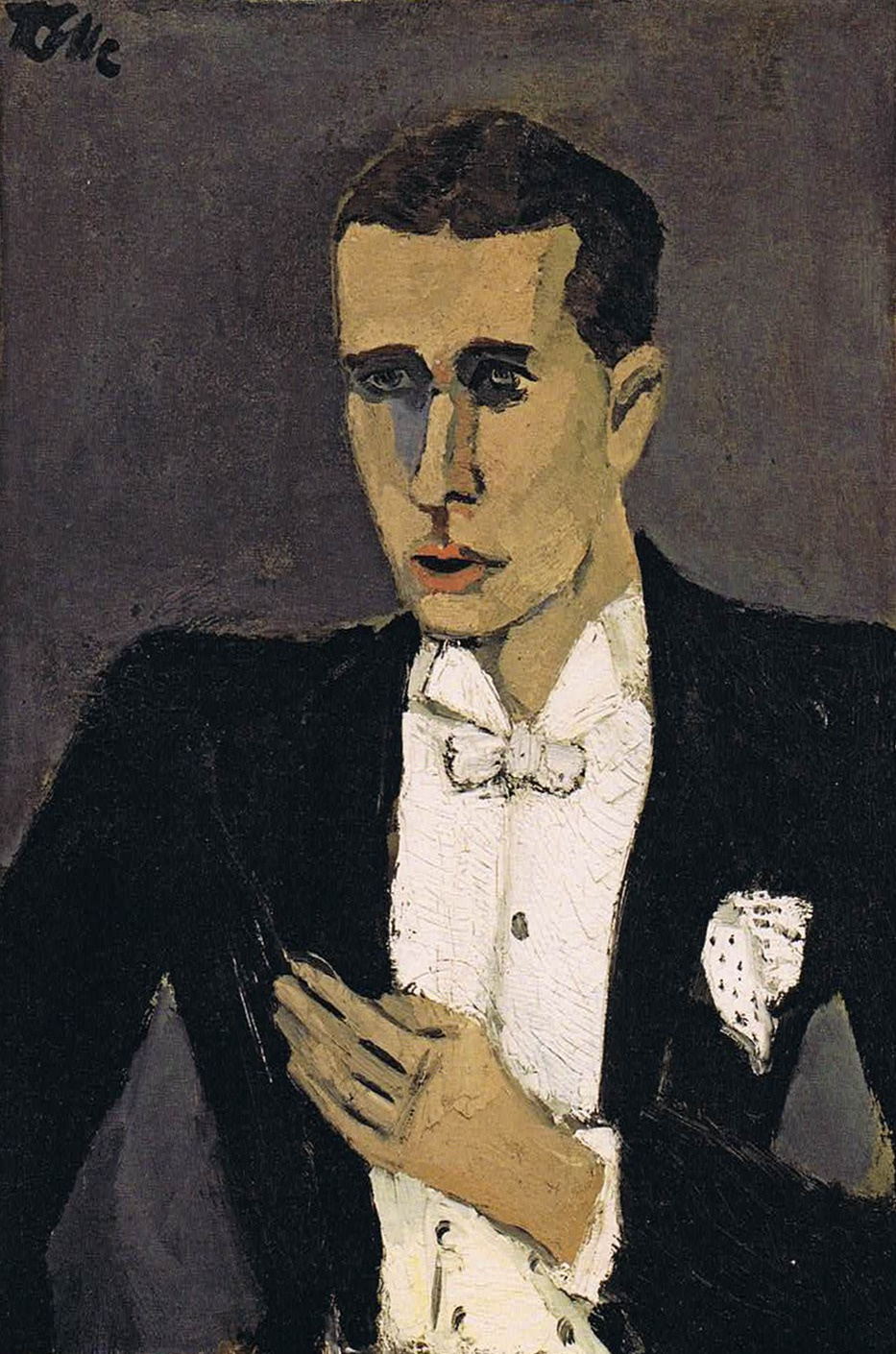
Self portrait in white tie, 1931
