= Arsy =

- Commune
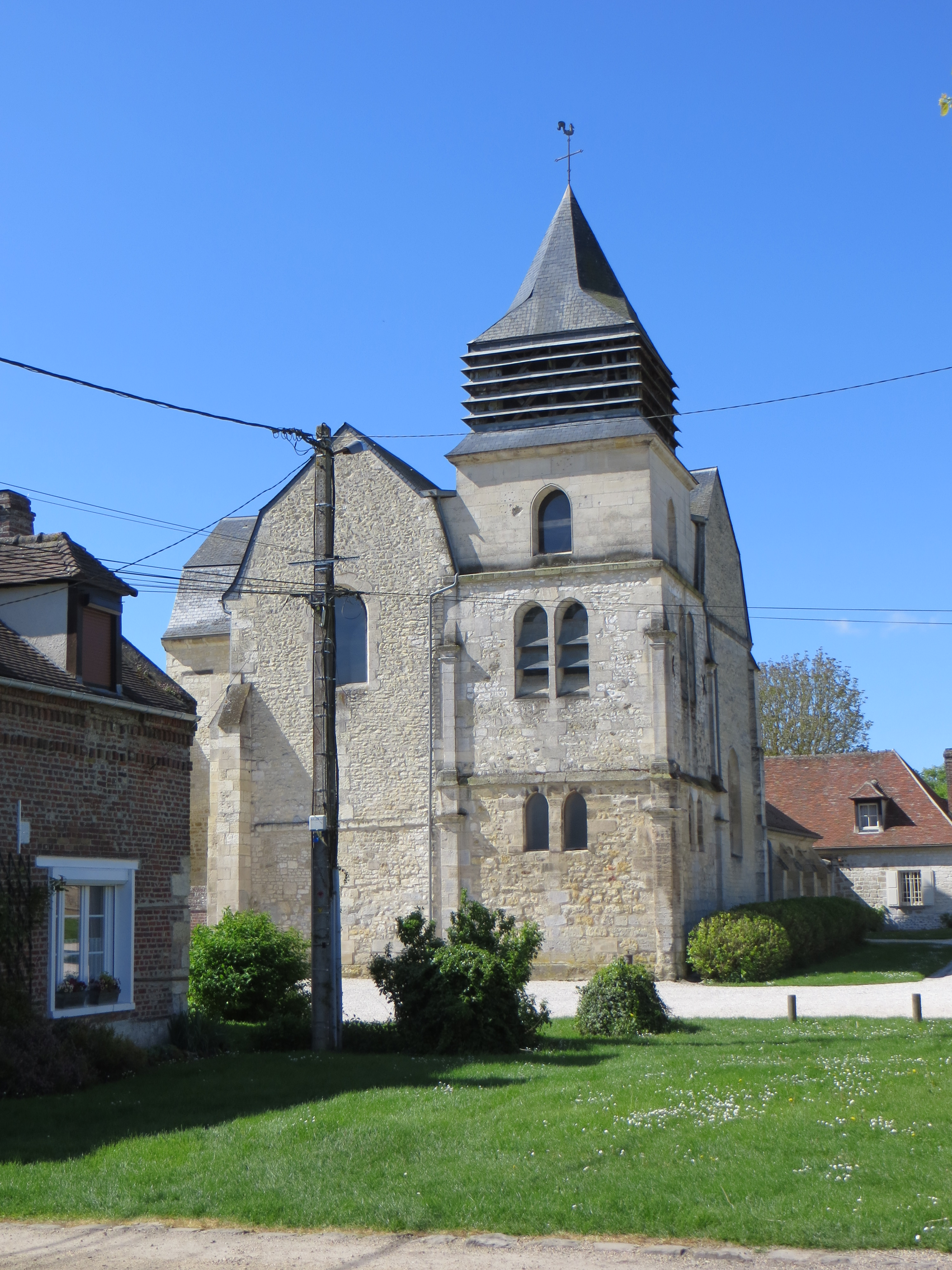
- The church in Arsy
- Location of Arsy
- Location within France Location within Hauts-de-France
- Coordinates: 49°24′06″N 2°40′58″E
- Country: France
- Region: Hauts-de-France
- Department: Oise
- Arrondissement: Compiègne
- Canton: Estrées-Saint-Denis
- Intercommunality: CC Plaine Estrées

Government
  - Mayor (2020–2026): Joël Thibault
- Area^{1}: 7.27 km^{2} (2.81 sq mi)
- Elevation: 72 m (236 ft)
- Highest elevation: 106 m (348 ft)
- Lowest elevation: 62 m (203 ft)
- Population (2023): 832
  - Density: 114/km^{2} (296/sq mi)
- Time zone: UTC+01:00 (CET)
  - Summer (DST): UTC+02:00 (CEST)
- INSEE/Postal code: 60024 /60190
- ^{1} French Land Register data, which excludes lakes, ponds, glaciers > 1 km^{2} (0.386 sq mi or 247 acres) and river estuaries.

Arsy (French pronunciation: [aʁsi]) is a commune in the Oise department in northern France.

== Population ==
Historical population
Year	Pop.	±% p.a.
1968	453	—
1975	506	+1.59%
1982	650	+3.64%
1990	871	+3.73%
1999	898	+0.34%
2007	798	−1.46%
2012	783	−0.38%
2017	770	−0.33%
2023	832	+1.30%
Source: INSEE

== See also ==
- Communes of the Oise department
