= Martin Provost =

French film director, writer and actor

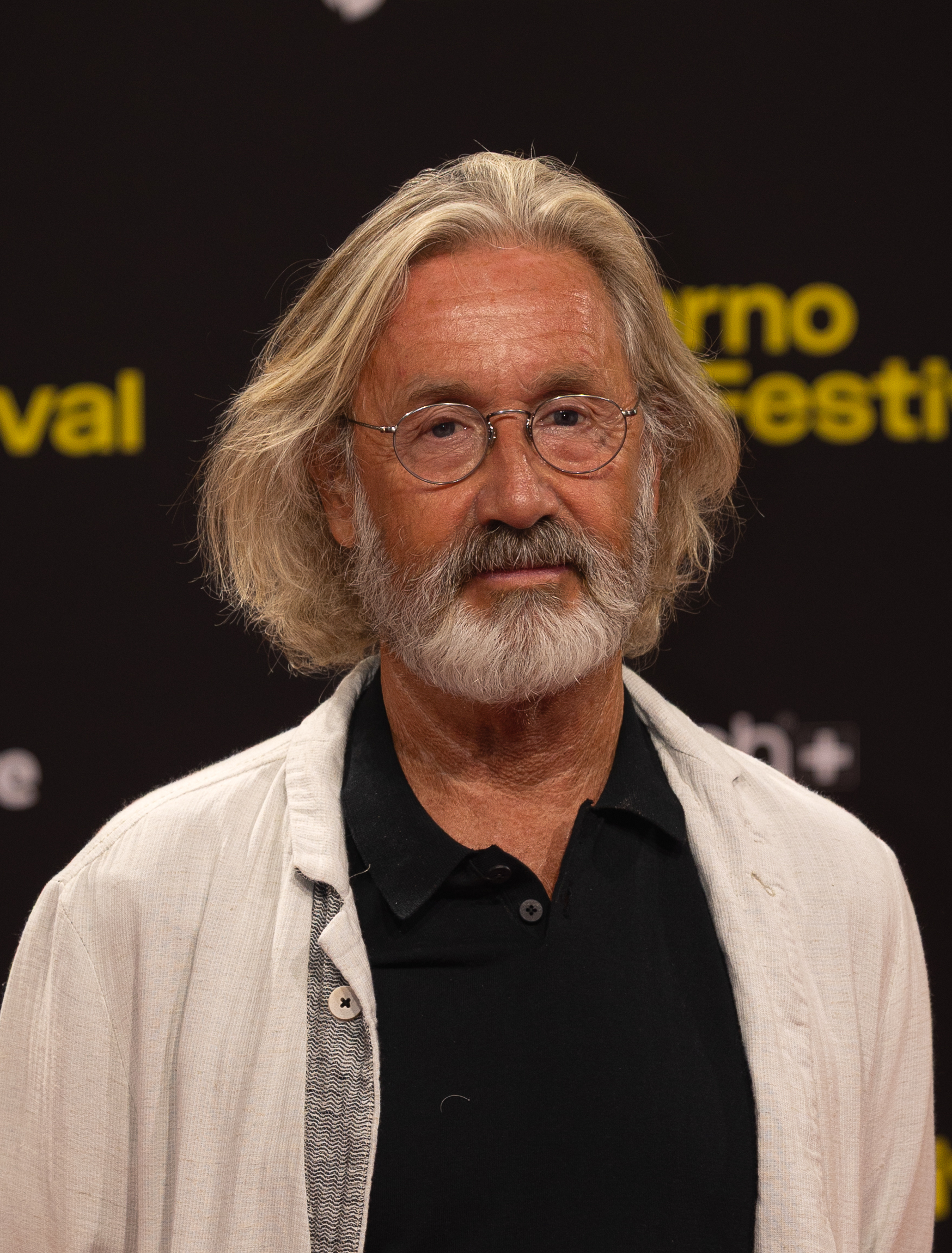
- Provost in 2026
- Born: 13 May 1957 (age 69); Brest, France
- Occupations: Film director, writer, actor
- Years active: 1989–present

Martin Provost (French: [maʁtɛ̃ pʁɔvo]; born 13 May 1957) is a French film director, writer and actor. He wrote and directed films such as Séraphine and Le Ventre de Juliette. Violette, his 2013 biographical drama about author Violette Leduc, was screened in the Special Presentation section at the 2013 Toronto International Film Festival.

== Filmography ==
=== Feature films ===
Year	English Title	Original Title	Notes
1997	Tortilla y cinema		
2003	Le Ventre de Juliette		Avignon Film Festival - Prix Tournage
2008	Séraphine		César Award for Best Film; César Award for Best Original Screenplay; Newport Beach Film Festival - Best Film; Newport Beach Film Festival - Best Director; Newport Beach Film Festival - Best Screenplay; Nominated—César Award for Best Director; Nominated—Lumière Award for Best Film; Nominated—Lumière Award for Best Director; Nominated—Lumière Award for Best Screenplay; Nominated—Prix Jacques Prévert du Scénario for Best Original Screenplay
2011	The Long Falling	Où va la nuit	
2013	Violette		
2017	The Midwife	Sage femme	
2020	How to Be a Good Wife	La bonne épouse	
2023	Bonnard, Pierre and Marthe	Bonnard, Pierre et Marthe	
2026	Love Lessons	Demain je tombe amoureux	

=== Other credits ===
Year	Title	Notes
1992	Cocon	Short film
2006	SantApprentice	Only writer

=== Only actor ===
Year	Title	Notes
1976	A Young Emmanuelle	
1977	Les Enquêtes du commissaire Maigret	TV series
1977	Les Folies Offenbach	TV mini-series
1977	Au plaisir de Dieu	TV mini-series
1977	Banlieue sud-est	TV mini-series
1978	Le Devoir de français	Telefilm
1978	Messieurs les ronds-de-cuir	Telefilm
1979	Au théâtre ce soir	TV series
1980	Tarendol	Telefilm
1980	Les Héritiers	TV series
1981	Pause-café	TV series
1981	Histoires de voyous : Opération Primevère	Telefilm
1983	Emmenez-moi au théâtre : La Baye	Telefilm
1984	Comme les doigts de la main	Short film
1985	L'Histoire en marche: Les prisonnières	Telefilm
1988	Alice	
1989	Pentimento	
2002	20, avenue Parmentier	

== Published books ==
- 1992: Aime-moi vite
- 2007: Léger, humain, pardonnable
- 2009: La Rousse Péteuse
- 2010: Bifteck
