= List of naïve art artists =

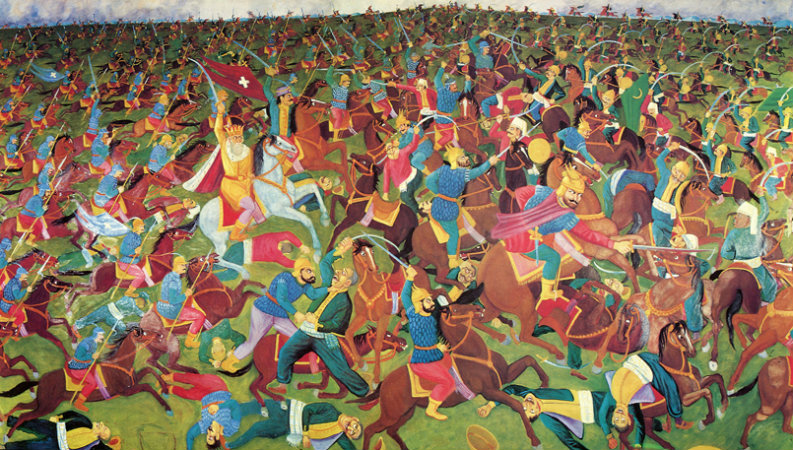
An example of Janko Brašić's work. Kosovski Boj (the Battle of Kosovo)

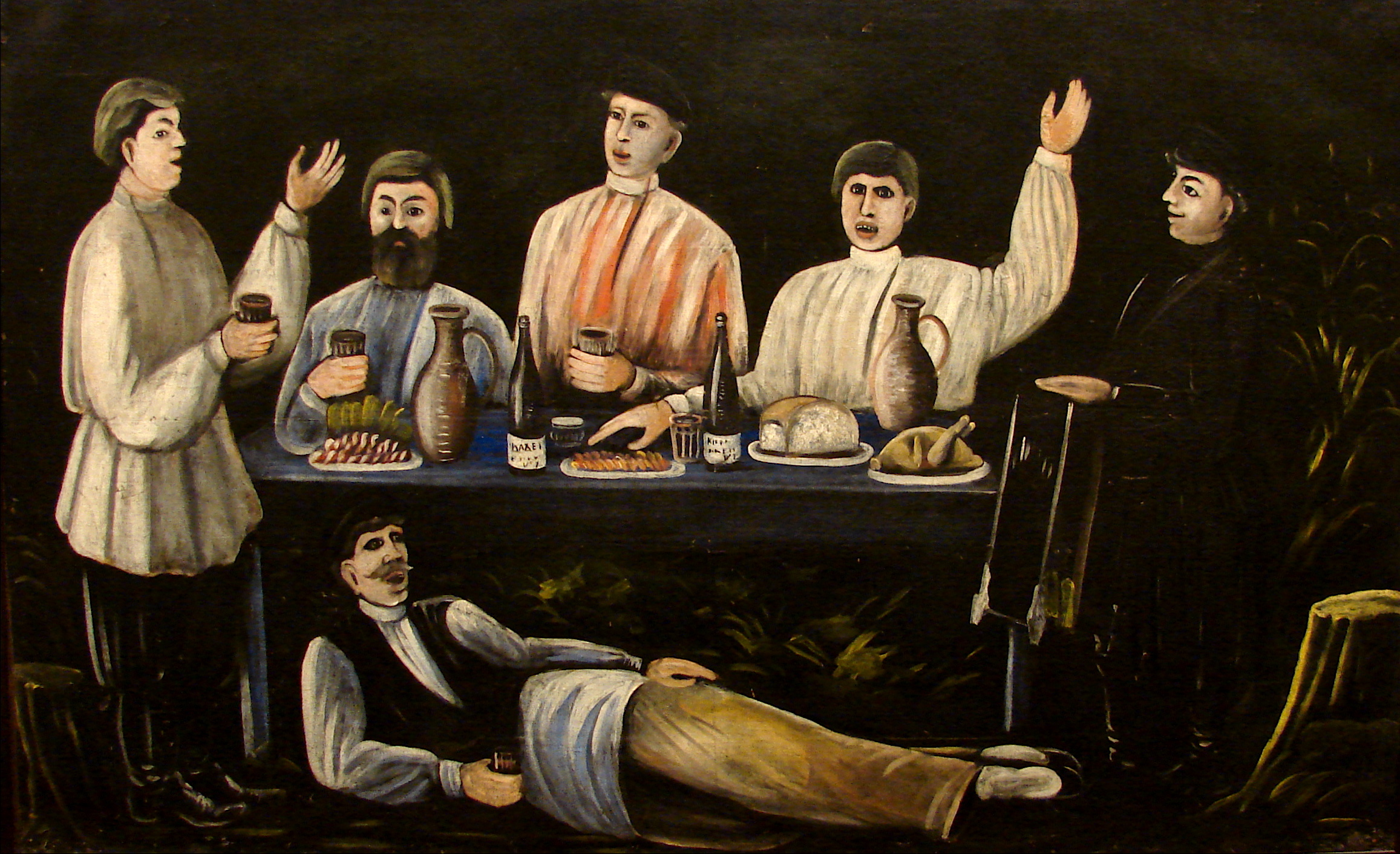
Feast of the Malakans by Niko Pirosmani

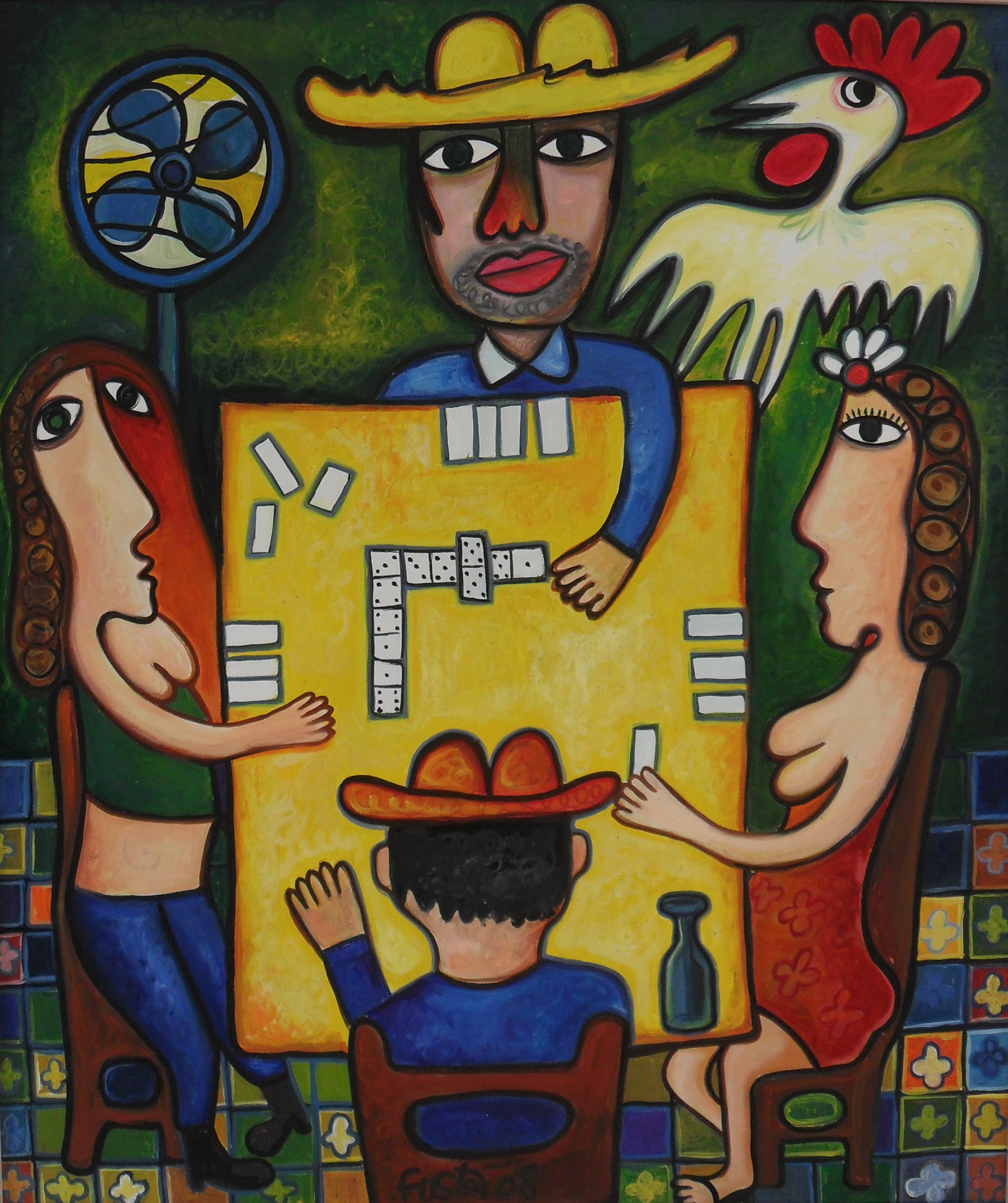
The Domino Players (Juego de Domino), Oil on canvas, by Cuban artist José Rodríguez Fuster.

This list includes artists who are known for their works of naïve art.

== 18th century ==
- Oluf Braren (Danish, 1787–1839)
- Justus DaLee (American, 1793–1878)
- Edward Hicks (American, 1780–1849)
- Joshua Johnson (American, 1763–1824)

== 19th century ==
- James Bard (American, 1815–1897)
- Ferdinand Cheval, known as 'le facteur Cheval' (French, 1836–1924)
- Denys Corbet (Guernsey, 1826–1910)
- Olof Krans (American, 1838–1916)
- Cándido López (Argentine, 1840–1902)
- Niko Pirosmani (Georgian, 1862–1918)
- Peter Rindisbacher (Swiss, 1806–1834)
- Henri Rousseau (French, 1844–1910)
- Susan Waters (American, 1823–1900)

== 20th century ==
- Gesner Abelard (Haitian, born 1922)
- Ellinor Aiki (Estonian, 1893–1969)
- Andreas Alariesto (Finnish, 1900–1989)
- Alyona Azernaya (Russian, born 1966)
- Jan Bacur (Serbian, born 1937)
- Jan Balet (German, 1913–2009)
- Nina Barka (Marie Smirsky) (French, 1908–1986)
- Ilija Bašičević (Serbian, 1895–1972)
- André Bauchant (French, 1873–1958)
- Sarah Berman (Ukrainian-American, 1895- 1957)
- Kateryna Bilokur (Ukrainian, 1900–1961)
- Janko Brašić (Serbian, 1906–1994)
- Camille Bombois (French, 1883–1970)
- Frédéric Bruly Bouabré (Ivorian, born 1923)
- Eugen Buktenica (Croatian, 1914–1997)
- Sam Byrne (Australian, 1883–1978)
- Charles Callins (Australian, 1887–1982)
- Zuzana Chalupová (Serbian, 1925–2001)
- Emily Chrisp (British, 1912–1974)
- Paulina Constancia (Filipino, born 1970)
- Henry Darger (American, 1892–1973)
- Michel Delacroix (French, born 1933)
- Préfète Duffaut (Haitian, born 1923)
- Emerik Feješ (Croatian, 1904–1969)
- Howard Finster (American, 1916–2001)
- Robert-Émile Fortin (Canadian, 1945–2004)
- Lucy Fradkin (American, born 1953)
- George Fredericks (British, born 1929)
- José Rodríguez Fuster (Cuban, born 1946)
- Dragan Gaži (Croatian, 1930–1983)
- Ivan Generalić (Croatian, 1914–1992) (Hlebine)
- Josip Generalić (Croatian, 1935–2004) (Hlebine)
- Mokarrameh Ghanbari (Iranian, 1928–2005)
- Petronėlė Gerlikienė (Lithuanian, 1905–1979)
- Petar Grgec (Croatian, 1933–2006)
- Theora Hamblett (American, 1895–1977)
- James Hampton (American, 1909–1964)
- Krsto Hegedušić (Croatian, 1901–1975)
- Mary Jewels (British, 1886–1977)
- Daniel Johnston (American, 1961–2019) (Austin)
- Martin Jonaš (Serbian, 1924 – 1996)
- Drago Jurak (Croatian, 1911–1994)
- Bob Justin (American, born 1941)
- Ferenc Kalmar (Hungarian, born 1928)
- John Kane (American, 1860–1934)
- Alena Kish (Belarusian, 1889 or 1896–1949)
- Mijo Kovačić (Croatian, born 1935)
- Arnold Kramer (American, 1882–1976)
- Siegfried L. Kratochwil (Austrian, 1916–2005)
- Ivan Lacković Croata (Croatian, 1932–2004)
- Pavel Leonov (Russian, 1920–2011)
- Maud Lewis (Canadian, 1903–1970)
- Antonio Ligabue (Italian, 1899–1965)
- Séraphine Louis, known as 'Séraphine de Senlis' (French, 1864–1942)
- Claudine Loquen, (French, born 1965)
- L. S. Lowry (British, 1887–1976)
- Manuel Lepe Macedo (Mexican, 1936–1984)
- Radia Bent Lhoucine (Moroccan, 1912–1994)
- Ioan Măric (Romanian, born 1945)
- Ferreira Louis Marius (Brazilian, born 1953)
- Katya Medvedeva (Russian, born 1937)
- Martin Mehkek (Croatian, 1936–2014)
- Manuel Mendive (Cuban, born 1944)
- Dobrosav Milojevic (Serbian, born 1948)
- Ethel Wright Mohamed (American, 1906–1992)
- Grandma Moses, Anna Mary Robertson (American, 1860–1961)
- Franjo Mraz (Croatian, 1910–1981) (Hlebine)
- Navitrolla (Estonian, born 1970)
- Radi Nedelchev (Bulgarian, born 1938)
- Norman Neasom (British, 1915–2010)
- Nikifor (Polish, 1895–1968)
- Mary Nohl (American, 1914–2001) (Fox Point, Wisconsin)
- Teofil Ociepka (Polish, 1891–1978)
- Stan Ioan Pătraş (Romanian, 1908–1977)
- Bryan Pearce (British, 1929–2007)
- Mario Perez (Cuban, born 1943)
- Raphael Perez (Israeli, born 1965)
- Dominique-Paul Peyronnet (French, 1872–1943)
- Nan Phelps (American, 1904–1990)
- Horace Pippin (American, 1888–1946)
- Maria Prymachenko (Ukrainian, 1908–1997)
- Ivan Rabuzin (Croatian, 1921–2008)
- Polina Raiko (Ukrainian, 1927–2004)
- Bárbaro Rivas (Venezuelan, 1893–1967)
- Markey Robinson (Irish, 1918–1999)
- Konstantin Rodko (Latvian, 1908–1995)
- Vasily Romanenkov (Russian, 1953–2013)
- Heinz Seelig (Israeli, 1909–1992)
- Oles Semernya (Ukrainian, 1936–2012)
- Jon Serl (American, 1894–1993)
- Jean Pierre Serrier (French, 1934-1989)
- Yeshayahu Sheinfeld (Israeli, 1909–1979)
- Mary Michael Shelley (American, born 1950)
- Chico da Silva (Brazil, 1910-1985)
- Chris (Simpsons artist) (British, born 1983)
- Matija Skurjeni (Croatian, 1898–1990)
- Petar Smajić (Croatian, 1910–1985)
- Peter Smith (British, born 1967)
- Dragiša Stanisavljević (Serbian, born 1921)
- Eric L. Stewart (Australian, 1907–1970)
- Slavko Stolnik (Croatian, 1929–1991)
- Bunleua Sulilat (Thai, 1932–1996)
- Henry Stockley (British, 1892–1982)
- Chaibia Talal (Moroccan, 1929–2004)
- Josefa Tolrà (Spanish, 1880–1959)
- Lavoslav Torti (Croatian, 1875–1942)
- Bracha Turner (Israeli, 1922–2011)
- Ivan Večenaj (Croatian, 1920–2013)
- Guido Vedovato (Italian, born 1961)
- Arthur Villeneuve (Canadian, 1910–1990)
- Mirko Virius (Croatian, 1889–1943)
- Miguel García Vivancos (Spanish, 1895–1972)
- Louis Vivin (French, 1861–1936)
- Elena Volkova (Russian, 1915–2013)
- Alfred Wallis (British, 1855–1942)
- Scottie Wilson (British, 1890–1972)
- Fred Yates (British, 1922–2008)
- Sergey Zagraevsky (Russian, 1964–2020)
- Oliver Kilbourn (British, 1904–1993)
- Hafida Zizi (Moroccan, born 1976)

== See also ==
- Lists of artists § Lists of artists by discipline
