= Bracha (name) =

Bracha is a Jewish benediction.

Bracha may also refer to:

- Bracha Eden and Alexander Tamir (1928–2006), Israeli pianist duo
- Bracha Fuld (1927–1946), German-born Jewish guerrilla fighter
- Bracha Habas (1900–1968), Israeli journalist, literary editor and writer
- Bracha Jaffe (born 1988), American Orthodox Jewish singer
- Bracha L. Ettinger (born 1948), Israeli-French artist, writer, psychoanalyst and philosopher
- Bracha Turner (1925–2011), Israeli-American naive artist
- Bracha van Doesburgh (born 1981), Dutch actress
- Bracha Peli (1892–1986) was the founder and owner of the Israeli publishing house, Massada
- Bracha Serri (1940–2013), Israeli poet,
- Bracha Qafih (1922–2013), Israeli rabbanit, who was awarded the Israel Prize for her charitable work
- Bracha Zefira (1910–1990), Israeli folk singer, songwriter, musicologist, and actress

- Gilad Bracha, American software engineer
- Shlomi Bracha (born 1962), Israeli musician and record producer
