= George Frederick =

George Frederick or Georg Friedrich may refer to:

- George A. Frederick (1842–1924), German-American architect
- George Frederick, Margrave of Brandenburg-Ansbach (1539–1603)
- George Frederick II, Margrave of Brandenburg-Ansbach (1678–1703)
- George Frederick (horse) (1871–1896), a British Thoroughbred racehorse and sire
- George III, King of the United Kingdom (George William Frederick, 1738–1820)
- George IV, King of the United Kingdom (George Augustus Frederick, 1762–1830)
- George Frederick of Nassau-Siegen (1606–1674)
- George Frederick, Count of Erbach-Breuberg (1636–1653)
- George Frederick, Margrave of Baden-Durlach (1573–1638)
- Georg Friedrich Prinz von Preussen (born 1976)
- Georg Friedrich (actor) (born 1966), Austrian actor

== See also ==
- George Fredericks (born 1929), English artist
