= Vedovato =

Vedovato is an Italian surname. Notable people with the surname include:

- Giuseppe Vedovato (1912–2012), Italian politician
- Guido Vedovato (born 1961), Italian painter and sculptor
