= Joseph Dadoune =

French artist (born 1975)

Yosef Joseph Yaakov Dadoune
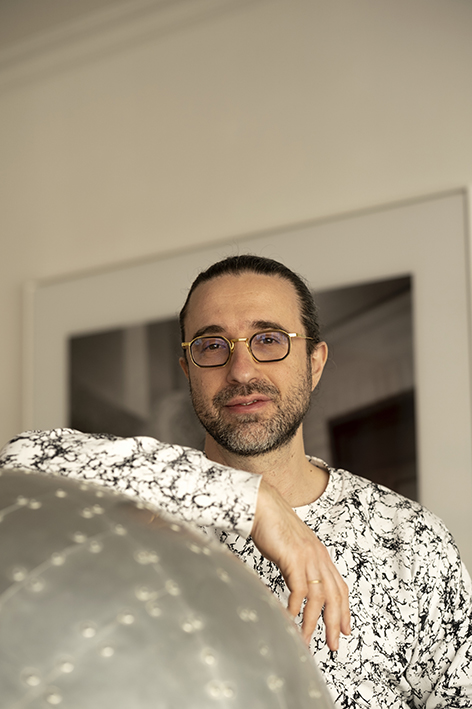
- Born: 24 April 1975 (age 51); Nice, France
- Website: josephdadoune.net

Yosef Joseph Yaakov Dadoune, born in Nice (France) on the 24th of April 1975, is an artist whose protean work combines video, photography, performance, drawing, painting, sound production, installation and architecture.

== Background ==
His practice is permeated by the tensions between the Eastern and Western world, between religious and secular life, between central power and the periphery, between the real and the imaginary. He brings together the intimate body and political body, the desire for protection and social action, housing and individuality, territory and confinement, in works that resonate with questions of exile, gender and identity.

In a utopian dimension of art, he is particularly interested in post-colonial issues and contemporary symbolic violence, drawing on the past and the sacred, which he formally links to the present. Establishing that all materiality carries its own symbolic charge, and thus carries an ancient semantics, he offers to question and cross time, sometimes resorting to strangeness, to a kind of manifestation of the invisible, and thus finding "a way to show by hiding, to preserve the truth".

== Artistic career ==
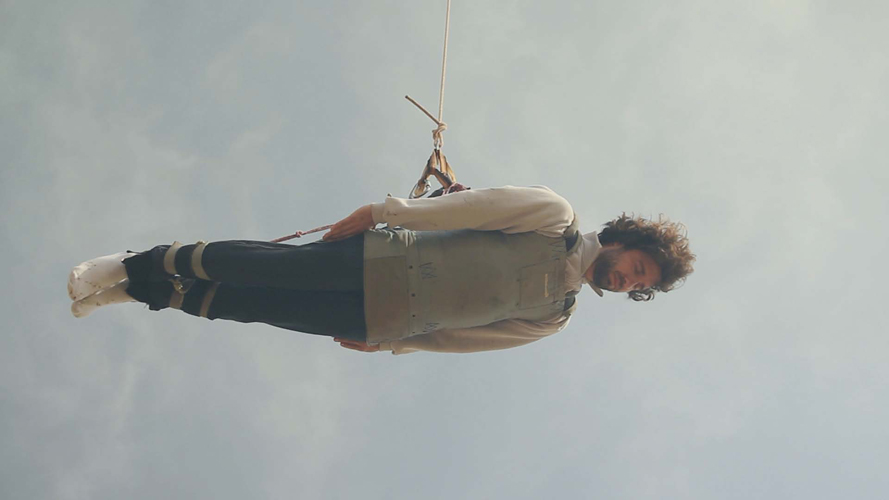
Phoenix (2010), HD two channel DVD projection, The Israel Museum collection

Following a childhood that brought him from Nice to the development town of Ofakim in Israel's Negev desert, Dadoune became known in the early 2000s, in both France and Israel, for his film Zion (2006–07), produced with the support and participation of the Louvre. Actress Ronit Elkabetz is the main character, playing an allegory of Jerusalem.

In 2008, he developed a cycle of works entitled In the Desert in which he explored the economic, social, and cultural reality of Ofakim. For the project, Dadoune produced films, gathered archival documents, initiated guided tours, invited journalists, and tried to harness as many people as possible to deliver Ofakim from its status as a "non-place".

In 2010 he began to focus on drawing and created monumental surfaces slathered in tar that he also added to various objects and materials. Some of these tar pieces were exhibited at Fondation d'entreprise Ricard in Paris and at Petach Tikva Museum of Art in Israel.

Among his other striking pieces are the noteworthy Impossible Calendars (2013), exhibited at Tel Aviv Museum of Art for the 100th anniversary of Dada, and Barrière protectrice (2017), a series of autobiographical war drawings published as a book by Éditions Arnaud Bizalion.

In 2017, he was named a Knight of Arts and Letters by the French Minister of Culture, and in July that year, his project An Arab Spring (comprising 233 photographs and 17 videos) was added to the collections of the Parisian Centre Pompidou. In October 2017, Dadoune was the invited artist for the City of Versailles Night of Creation, where he presented a pivotal selection of works under the title Sillons. In 2018, he received the art prize from Fondation Renée et Léonce Bernheim.

=== The food ===
In the late 90s and early 2000s, Joseph Dadoune developed a performative and photographic practice linked to flesh and food. In the series À l'intérieur de la zone (“Inside the zone”) (1998-2000), SNO / Le Club (“SNO/The Club”) (2000), Révolution (“Revolution”) (2001), Milk Teeth (2001) and Universes (2000-2003), he engages his body in ritualistic and coded attitudes. He adorned himself with the guts and parts of skinned animals, and increased the symbolic charge of foods with abundant value: milk, honey, bread dough, pomegranate seeds or chocolate. In An Arab Spring (2013), tribute to the Arab Spring, he accumulated pittas, slices of unleavened bread, recognizing bread as a universally shared material and inviting us to question ourselves on the singularity and rootedness of popular uprisings. He continues to work with these nourishing elements, pomegranate juice, wax and honey, which he combines with a painter's classic techniques of oils and pastels.

=== The tar ===
Tar, a bituminous putty, appeared in Dadoune's work in 2012 with Father porté par mes 9 doigts (“Father carried by my 9 fingers”), which he created during a residency at MANA Contemporary in New Jersey (USA), and Black Box inside Square (2012 and 2013), a black cube borrowed from references to the cramped, bare habitat, where tar appears as the substance associated with the first photographic process: the darkroom. Marked by childhood images - in the shipyards of Brittany, in reference to his father, and in the Negev desert - he works with this viscous, reflective and impenetrable black material, leading it astray from its primary functions of insulation and protection. He formalizes his reflections on standardized architecture with Le Kiosque Noir (“The Black Kiosque”) (2013-2014), attributing to black the profound force of night, the simple and personal construction of a hut. From these vibrant blacks marked by his gestures, in 2016-2017, he created Au commencement, Calendrier impossible (““At the Beginning, Impossible Calendar”), a series of 20 tars on paper, and installed a vast black square on the floor, Flooring time, which he laid out on the checkered tiles of the Espace Richaud in Versailles. Then will ensue the works in striated tar and worked in volume, Furrow testimony and Eccentric Sensoriality, Réplica and Voisins (“Neighbors”) (2018).

=== The flowers ===
In 2015, flowers produced on paper in pastel emerged in Joseph Dadoune's work. Charcoal flowers carrying life and death ("Fleurs / After War. Blind Spot / Tel Aviv", 2015-2016); flowers in bright and varied colours evoking exile ("Lost Roots/Lost Memory/We New", 2017) or the encounter with the Other ("Found you", 2022). In 2023, with the series "Fleurs/camouflages, périphérie", Joseph Dadoune displayed his charcoal drawings on large limewood panels. These flowers echo the plants that survive with virtually no water on the edge of the desert: palm trees, thistles and asphodels. For Lucia Sagradini-Neumann: “The use and choice of paper and pencil that relate to the fragility of the form, and the choice of motif - the vulnerable, graceful flower - bear the marks of the intemperance of our times”.

== Solo and group exhibitions ==
Joseph Dadoune has taken part in over 200 solo and group exhibitions in Europe, the United States, India and the Middle East. His work has been shown in solo exhibitions at the Espace Richaud in Versailles, the Plateau / FRAC Ile-de-France (Regional Fund for Contemporary Art) and the Musée d’art et d’histoire du Judaïsme in Paris, the Petah Tikva Museum of Art and the Kolkata Center for Creativity in India, during the Indian Art Fair. His videos have been shown at the Musée de la chasse et de la Nature, the Auditorium of the Musée du Louvre, the Palais de Tokyo and at the White Box NYC.

Among the group exhibitions and international fairs in which he has taken part, we can mention the FIAC and the Pernod-Ricard Foundation in Paris, the Tel Aviv Museum of Fine Arts and the Israel Museum in Jerusalem, the Busan Biennial in South Korea, Le Louvre Lens, the Universidad Nacional de Tres de Febrero in Argentina and the Ras Al Khaimah Fine Arts Festival in the United Arab Emirates.

== Works in public collections ==
Dadoune's works are included in the collections of Centre Georges Pompidou, the Louvre, and FIAC in Paris, as well as FRAC Normandy Rouen, the Israel Museum, Jerusalem, and Petach Tikva Museum of Art, Israel.

== Bibliography ==
- (Fr) Maurey Catherine, Joseph Dadoune: Les valises itinérantes (Nice: Galerie Le Chanjour, 1996–97).
- (En) Joseph Dadoune: Bienvenue au Club (Welcome to the Club) (Tel Aviv: Alon Segev Gallery, 2001).
- (Fr) Thomas Zoritchak, Universes 2000–2003 (Tel Aviv: Alon Segev Gallery, Mercaba Pictures, 2004).
- (Heb + En) Drorit Gur Arie, Ktzia Alon, Fabrice Flahutez, Ruth Malul Zadka, Joseph Dadoune: A Cinematic Trilogy (Petach Tikva, Israel: Petach Tikva Museum of Art, 2007) (OCLC 835945821).
- (Heb + Fr + En) Haviva Pedaya, Drorit Gur Arie, Dr. Yvonne Kozlovsky-Golan, Raphaël Sigal, Omri Herzog, Abdellah Taïa, Yoav Shemueli, Amnon Raz Krakotzkin, "Yosef-Joseph Dadoune: Regarding Sion / À propos de Sion," Hakivun Mizrakh [East-Word], 17 (special edition; Winter 2008–09), Bimat Kedem Publishing, Israel (OCLC 793891186)
- (Heb + En) Drorit Gur Arie, Shani Bar-On, Audrey Illouz, Conversation between Yosef Joseph Dadoune & Zvi Efrat, Yitzhak Krispel, Efrat-Kowalsky Architects, Dan Hason, Dadoune | Von Beider, Ofakim (Horizons) (Petach Tikva, Israel: Petach Tikva Museum of Art, 2012) (ISBN 978-965-7461-04-4).
- (Fr) Fabrice Flahutez, L'oeuvre ouverte de Joseph Dadoune, Le kiosque noir 2015, Espace d'art Le Moulin, Ville de La Valette-du-Var, 2015 (ISSN 1969-2625)
- (Fr) Lucia Sagradini, Icônes 61, Joseph Dadoune, Multitudes, 2015 (ISSN 0292-0107)
- (Fr + Heb) Isabelle Bourgeois, Yosef-Joseph-Yaakov Dadoune: Pour qui sont ces serpents qui sifflent sur vos têtes? (Kibbutz Ashdot Ya'akov Meuhad, Israel: Beit Uri And Rami Nehostan Museum, 2016) (ISBN 978-965-92225-1-3)
- (Heb + En) Doron von Beider, Yosef Joseph Yaakov Dadoune: In Praise of the Sequence (Tel Aviv: The Lobby, 2016).
- (Fr) Fabrice Flahutez, Joseph Dadoune: barrière protectrice (Paris: Arnaud Bizalion Éditeur, 2017) (ISBN 978-2-369-80109-2).
- (Fr + Heb) Isabelle Bourgeois, Drorit Gur Arie, Mikel Touval, Raphaël Zagury-Orly, Doron von Beider, and Joseph Dadoune, Sillons: Yosef Joseph Dadoune (Paris: Arnaud Bizalion Éditeur, 2017) (ISBN 978-2-369-80123-8).
