= Dalia Levin =

Israeli museum director and art curator (born 1946)

- דליה לוין
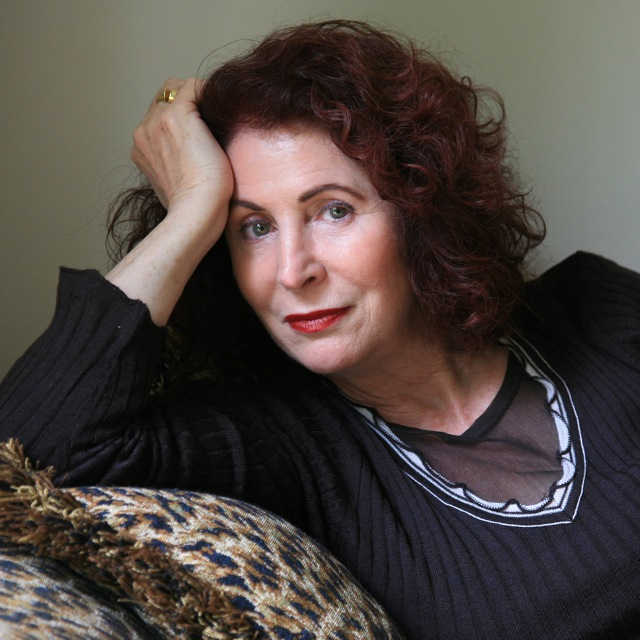
- Born: September 18, 1946 (age 79); Tel Aviv, Israel

Dalia Levin (Hebrew: דליה לוין; born September 18, 1946) is an Israeli museum director and art curator. She was director and chief curator of Herzliya Museum of Contemporary Art in 1993-2014 and chief curator of Petah Tikva Museum of Art in 1988–1993.

== Biography ==
Dalia Levin was born in Tel-Aviv, Israel. She graduated from the Hebrew University of Jerusalem Law School. She then studied Art history and Museology in Tel Aviv University. She studied painting with Israeli artist Eliahu Gat.

== Art career ==
In 1987 she started to work as curator in Petach Tikva Museum of Art. In 1993 she was appointed of director of the Herzliya Museum. She sat on several important committees, among them the 50th Venice Biennale international committee of judges of the Golden Lion award; the committees of judges of the Israel Prize in the Arts; the Wolf Prize committee of judges in the Arts.

=== Herzliya Museum of Contemporary Art ===
When Levin took over, it was part of the local Yad Labanim memorial. Yael German, the newly elected mayor, wished to use the museum to support and promote local artists. Levin persuaded German that the quality of work must be the defining criterion, and not the artists' place of residence. She set out to establish the museum as an experimental platform of quality contemporary art with the financial support of the city. In addition, Yaacov Alkov, a resident of Herzliya, donated his private art collection, to the museum.

Under Levin's direction, the museum was renamed and the building was renovated. As a manager and chief curator, Levin focused on promoting young artists. Yehudit Sasportas, Guy Ben-Ner, Michal Helfman and Sigalit Landau made their debut at the museum. In return, they contributed many of their works for permanent exhibitions.

As of 2014, the museum spans 3,000 sq. meters, a three-fold increase over the time when Levin started. It runs on a fixed 2.5M NIS budget.

Levin organized three Biennales at the museum. At the end of 2013, Levin retired. The last exhibition that she curated, Rising Star (2014), brought together leading graduates of Israel's art schools.

=== Public positions ===
Since 1994, Levin has been a member of CIMAM, the International Committee of ICOM for Museums and Collections of Modern Art. Since 2011, she has been a member of the board of Minshar, School of Art, Tel Aviv.

== Notable exhibitions ==
- 2014 – Rising Star, Herzliya Museum of Contemporary Art
- 2013 – Other People's Problems: Conflicts and Paradoxes, Herzliya Museum of Contemporary Art
- 2012 – Cabinets of Wonder in Contemporary Art: From Astonishment to Disenchantment, Herzliya Museum of Contemporary Art
- 2012 – Boundaries on the Move: A Cross-Cultural Dialogue, Herzliya Museum of Contemporary Art
- 2011 – Numerator and Denominator, Herzliya Museum of Contemporary Art

== See also ==
- Israeli art
