= Josefa Tolrà =

Catalan medium and artist (1880–1959)

- Born: 6 January 1880; Cabrils, Catalonia, Spain
- Died: 15 October 1959 (aged 79); Cabrils
- Known for: Painting, spiritual medium
- Notable work: La gran teósofa (1953)
- Movement: Naïve art

Josefa Tolrà i Abril (6 January 1880 – 15 October 1959) was a Spanish Catalan medium and artist, known for her drawings, writings and embroideries made during her trance state.

Her works have been categorised as naïve art and exhibited in major Spanish museums such as the Queen Sofía National Museum Art Centre and the Prado Museum in Madrid, the National Museum of Art of Catalonia (MNAC) and the Barcelona Museum of Contemporary Art (MACBA) in Barcelona, as well as at the 59th Venice Biennale and the Pompidou Center in Paris.

== Biography ==
Tolrà was born on 6 January 1880 in Cabrils, Catalonia, Spain, in a family of peasants. As a young woman, she received very limited education and worked in a textile factory, where she met revolutionaries and spiritualists.

After the death of two of her three children, one of them during the Spanish Civil War, Tolrà began to practise as a medium and healer in the 1940s, when she was already over 60, after hearing voices and seeing faces as a result of the depression she fell into. According to Tolrà, her drawings and writings were the work of spirits and "beings of light", who dictated them to her, and while in a mediumistic trance. According to an art historian, she did not even recognise her works as her own. She referred to her drawings as Dibujo fuerza fluídica ("I draw fluidic force").

As a medium, Tolrà was said to communicate with deceased figures such as the Catalan poet Jacint Verdaguer, the French scientist Louis Pasteur, and the Spanish mystic Santa Teresa de Jesús, also seeing people's aura.

Her works attracted avant-garde Catalan artistic groups like Dau al Set. One of these, Club Cobalto 49, exhibited Tolrà's works for the first time at the Sala Gaspar in Barcelona on the evening of 18 January 1956 at a private event. The works were chosen by psychiatrist Joan Obiols i Vié and evaluated by art critic Alexandre Cirici. Tolrà had agreed to the exhibition, although she did not attend, as she rarely left her hometown. Tolrà soon became popular among artistic circles, and renowned artists visited her at her home in Cabrils such as Antoni Tàpies, Joan Brossa, Modest Cuixart and Moisès Villèlia i Sanmartín.

In almost 20 years, Tolrà produced a total of nearly a hundred drawings and also wrote a novel. Meanwhile, she also practised as a healer with her neighbours. She never sold her works, but gave them away as gifts. Her main and most representative work is La gran teòsofa (1953), which has been listed as part of the collection of the Prado Museum.

Further, Tolrà wrote poems and "transcribed" messages that she included in her drawings, which she ascribed to something or someone "guiding her hand". Although she was illiterate and almost always spoke the Catalan language, her "transcribed" writings were in Spanish, albeit with grammatical and spelling errors, and covered geography, history, philosophy, mysticism, religion and art.

Tolrà died on 15 October 1959 at the age of 79 at her home in her native Cabrils. Her legacy was preserved by her family, most of all by her daughter Maria, and was not publicly exhibited until 1998, when the Association for Culture and Contemporary Art in Mataró organised an exhibition of her works, including drawings owned by Joan Brossa. The chair in which she sat to create has also been preserved and has been displayed in exhibitions.

== Selected works ==
- Astro Sol, Tierra, Marte, Venus (1944)
- Personajes y animales (1945)
- Mujer con abalorios (1948)
- Dibujo gracia del siglo III (1948)
- Dibujo método fluídico representa César Augusto con su carro (1950)
- Paisaje del Congo Indio joven (1951)
- La gran teósofa (1953)
- Adán y Eva (1953)
- Musa coreana (1953)
- Dibujo fuerza fluídica. Última cena (1953)
- El alma de la fantasía (1959)
- Jardín del Eden

== Exhibitions ==
=== Permanent exhibitions and collections ===
- Barcelona Museum of Contemporary Art (MACBA)
- Pompidou Centre, Paris
- Prado Museum, Madrid
- Queen Sofía National Museum Art Centre, Madrid

=== Temporary exhibitions ===
- 2023: National Museum of Art of Catalonia, Barcelona (with Madge Gill)
- 2022: 59th Venice Biennale
- 2016: Galery of the Port of Tarragona
- 2016: Queen Sofía National Museum Art Centre
- 2015: Musée d'Art Naïf – Max Fourny, Paris
- 2015: National Museum of Art of Catalonia
- 2014: Can Palauet, Mataró
- 2011: Queen Sofía National Museum Art Centre

== Reception ==
Tolrà's work has been categorised as naïve art. According to art historian Josefa Mora Sánchez, Tolrà began by doodling and ended up painting spiritual beings. She also embroidered cloaks.

The art historian at the University of Barcelona Pilar Bonet considered three types of themes in Tolrà's work:

- Drawings with figures, scenes and landscapes depicting local customs, evocations of the world or her surroundings, and stories from the past
- Religious themes
- Characters and visions related to the occult world, such as figures of female seers, theosophists, astral beings or planetary visions

Her characters have been described as showing large, open eyes and an expression of surprise. They are said to be gravitating towards the viewer and mostly incorporeal, without hands or feet, in exotic dresses. Despite a perceived difficulty of representing volume, anatomical rigour and depth, Tolrà's lines have been characterized as controlled, exhibiting horror vacui, detail and chromaticism. The design consists of short lines and small stitches, a technique similar to the embroidery she learned as a child. She painted on low-quality paper and notebooks with simple materials such as pencils and felt-tip pens, and also embroidered on fabric. Further, Tolrà did not use templates, sketches or models.

== See also ==
- List of Naïve art artists
- Miguel García Vivancos
