= Yeshayahu Sheinfeld =

Israeli painter and industrialist (1909–1979)

Yeshayau Sheinfeld (Scheinfeld)
- ישעיהו שיינפלד
- Born: April 8, 1909; Bessarabia
- Died: April 1, 1979 (aged 69); Ramat Gan; Israel
- Education: self-taught
- Known for: Painting
- Movement: Naïve Art

Yeshayau Sheinfeld (Scheinfeld) (Hebrew: ישעיהו שיינפלד; 1909–1979) was an Israeli painter and industrialist.

== Early life and work ==
Sheinfeld was born in Bessarabia and in 1929 he emigrated to Mandate Palestine. He first resided in Magdiel, then in 1941 relocated to Petach Tikva where he found employment as a stonecutter and a road worker. In 1947, he established his own stonecutting factory which in time became one of the biggest quarries in Israel, producing thousands of tons of materials daily for the Israeli construction and road industry.

== Painting career ==
It was only in 1969 at age 60, that Scheinfeld first took up a paintbrush. In his first year, unwilling to reveal the need for self-expression, Scheinfeld worked surreptitiously in the early mornings or late nights - when no one was about.

Just a year later, in 1970, after a successful group exhibition in the Tel Aviv Museum of Art, Scheinfeld was recognized as one of the striking artists on the local Naïve art scene. Although his usual subject matter was the scenery of the land of Israel, Scheinfeld introduced the landscape using a mosaic pattern, something that had become his unique artistic signature. While Scheinfeld's favorite media were tempera and ink on board, he also worked in various others including acrylic on canvas and board, etching with hand-painted colors, mixed-media collage and even weaving.

Between 1971 and 1975, Scheinfeld gained wide international recognition and his artworks were exhibited not only in Israel, but also in Europe and in North and South America. In 1975, Scheinfeld's colorful pen-and-ink artwork ‘Aqueduct’ was featured in UNICEF’s New Year Round collection.

Although Scheinfeld had only a short ten-year career as an artist, in 2004 he was recognized by INSITA, the International Triennial congress of Naïve self-taught Art, as one of the four exceptional artists who played a major role in the international context of 20th century art.

== Collections ==
- Petach-Tikva Museum of Art, Petach-Tikva, Israel
- The President's Residence, Jerusalem, Israel
- Stadshof Nijmegen, The Netherlands
- Slovak National Gallery, Bratislava, Slovakia
- Musee d’Art spontane, Bruxelles, Belgium
- Musea Oost-Vlaanderen in Evolutie (MovE) Gent, Belgium
- Museum of La Creation Franche Begles, France
- The Magnes Collection of Jewish art and life, Berkeley University of California, United States
- Gallery of International Naive Art (GINA), Tel Aviv, Israel

== Exhibitions ==
=== 1970 ===
- Yad-Lebanim Museum, Petach Tikva, Israel
- Tel-Aviv Museum of Art, Tel-Aviv, Israel

=== 1971 ===
- Municipal Museum, Holon, Israel
- Israel-America Cultural Foundation, New York, USA
- The Union of American Hebrew Congregations, New York, USA
- Gallery La Boetle, New York, USA
- The Naive Art Gallery, New York, USA
- The Great Neck Library, New York, USA
- Traklin Gallery, Haifa, Israel
- Ben Yehuda Gallery, Tel Aviv, Israel

=== 1972 ===
- The Naïve Art Gallery, São Paulo, Brazil
- The Magnes Collection of Jewish art and life, Berkeley USA

=== 1973 ===
- Queens County Art & Cultural Center, New York, USA
- Ile Mostra Internazionale dei Naifs Contemporanei, Lugano, Switzerland
- Great Neck Library, New York, USA
- Weizmann Institute of Science, Rehovot, Israel
- Yad-Lebanim Museum, Petach Tikva, Israel

=== 1974 ===
- Gumprecht Gallery, Hamburg, Germany
- Regard Gallery, Lyon, France
- Ben Uri Museum, London, UK

=== 1975 ===
- UNICEF's Year Round collection, The United Nations NY, USA
- Runhof Gallery, Düsseldorf, Germany
- France TV art expo (French public national TV), Paris, France
- Sara Bar Gallery, Los Angeles, USA

=== 1976 ===
- Yad-Lebanim Museum, Petach Tikva, Israel

=== 1977 ===
- Canada-Israel Cultural Foundation, Montreal, Canada
- The Museum of Modern Art, Haifa, Israel

=== 1978 ===
- Delson Richter Gallery, Tel Aviv, Israel

=== 1980 ===
- Petach Tikva Museum of Art, "In memory of J. Scheinfeld", Petach Tikva, Israel

=== 1984 ===
- Rein C G Galleries, Minneapolis, USA
- The Museum of Modern Art, Haifa, Israel

=== 1987 ===
- Galerie de Oogappel, Haarlem, the Netherlands
- Galerie Hamer, Amsterdam, the Netherlands

=== 1990 ===
- Galerie Hamer, Amsterdam, the Netherlands

=== 2000 ===
- Galerie Hamer, Amsterdam, the Netherlands

=== 2004 ===
- Galerie Hamer, "Yeshayahu Scheinfeld", Amsterdam, the Netherlands
- Galerie Hamer, "Naieven Outsiders", Amsterdam, the Netherlands
- Slovak National Gallery, INSITA 2004, Bratislava, Slovakia

=== 2007 ===
- Petach Tikva Museum of Art, "Petting Corner", Petach Tikva, Israel
- Monart Art Museum, Ashdod, Israel
- Slovak National Gallery, INSITA 2007, Bratislava, Slovakia

=== 2008 ===
- Petach Tikva Museum of Art, "Etchings, Scratches and Scars- Changing Representations of the Israeli Soldier", Petach Tikva, Israel
- Kunsthaus Kannen, "Magic Arquitecture", Münster, Germany

=== 2012 ===
- Musée d'art spontané, "Visions Orientales Exposition d'Adib Fattal et Yeshayahu Scheinfeld", Brussels, Belgium

=== 2014 ===
- Petach Tikva Museum of Art, "Sea, Sail & a Boat", Petach Tikva, Israel
- Petach Tikva Museum of Art, "Fracture", Petach Tikva, Israel

=== 2015 ===
- Petach Tikva Museum of Art, "Urban Legend", Petach Tikva, Israel
