= Emily Chrisp =

English artist (1912–1974)

Emily M. Chrisp (1912–1974, née White, married surname often mistakenly given as Crisp) was an English artist who painted in the primitive/naïve style.

== Career ==
Chrisp began painting later in life, painting pictures for her grandchildren, and found fame in the late 1960s when model Twiggy's manager and boyfriend Justin de Villeneuve bought three of her paintings at an art fete at Hornsey. Interest followed, and not long after, her work was being shown in a West End art gallery. Her renown spread and her work was bought by celebrities such as Elton John, David Bailey, George Harrison and Andrew Loog Oldham, manager of the Rolling Stones. She was commissioned by the Duchess of Bedford to paint a view of Woburn Abbey as a gift for the Duke.

Due to her use of "matchstick men"/stick-figures, Chrisp's work was sometimes compared to that of L. S. Lowry, but she rejected the comparison: "Some people think that I paint like L.S. Lowry but whereas his colours are muted and grey, mine are gay and happy." She signed her work "E. M. Chrisp" and "Emily".

Chrisp was featured on a BBC Radio 4 programme on 28 January 1970, with her segment described as "The Happy Painter: Peter Noble meets Mrs Emily Chrisp, who in her 50s has become a successful artist."

A painting of Chrisp's was featured on a 2022 episode of the BBC programme, The Repair Shop (series 10, episode 14), first broadcast on 5 October 2022. Conservator Lucia Scalisi repaired a large and intricate imaginary townscape that was flaking badly.

== See also ==
- L. S. Lowry
- naïve art
