= Bracha Jaffe =

American singer (born 1989)

- Born: 1989 (age 37); Brooklyn, New York City, US
- Years active: 2013–present
- Website: brachajaffe.com

Bracha Jaffe (born 1989) is an American Orthodox Jewish singer.

== Music career ==
Jaffe began playing piano at four years old and would sing as well. She later auditioned for Malky Giniger's Voices of Youth Choir. In high school, she taught piano and gave voice lessons.

Jaffe began performing for local women’s events as a pregnant newlywed in nursing school. In line with Orthodox Jewish law, Jaffe sings only with an all-female band and plays only for all-female audiences. She also makes her social media accounts available only for female visitors.

== 2023 concert ban controversy ==
Jaffe was scheduled to perform in concert on January 15, 2023 at Hackney Empire in London. In late 2022, various religious authorities banned girls from local Jewish schools from attending the event, and the Vaad L'maan Tohar Machneinu ("group for the purity of our camp") branch of the Union of Orthodox Hebrew Congregations (UOHC) stated they "[endorse] and [support] this decision" to ban the concert, citing fears of "spiritual harm in ruchniyus [spirituality] and hashkafa [Jewish ethos]". In response, Jaffe said "Our girls need healthy kosher music, healthy kosher entertainment that will bring them closer to God. [...] I only want to be a positive role model.". In a video message, she said that she was "greatly saddened" by the controversy but nevertheless hoped to have "an emotional and spiritual connection" with fans at the concert. Reportedly, some women only attended the concert after hearing about the ban.

== Personal life ==
Jaffe was raised in Borough Park, Brooklyn, New York City, and lives there with her husband and five children. For a time, she lived in Far Rockaway.

Jaffe practiced for several years as a nurse practitioner, until she left in September 2022.
