= Alyona Azernaya =

Russian painter

- Born: Elena Pavlovna Panicheva; March 9, 1966; Ekaterinburg, Russia
- Known for: Painting, Architecture, Art criticism
- Movement: Naïve art, Russian symbolism

Alyona Azernaya (in Russian: Алёна Азёрная), born March 9, 1966, Ekaterinburg, Russia is a contemporary Russian naïve painter. Her name has been transliterated from Russian as : Alyona Azernaya, Alena Azernay, Aliona Azernaia, Elena Azernaya, Aliona Aziornaya.

== Biography ==
Alyona Azernaya was born in 1966, in Ekaterinburg.

In 1989 she graduated in architecture from Sverdlovsk Institute of Architecture (now called Urals Academy of Architecture). In 1999 she graduated in art critic from Ural State Academy of Visual Arts.

In 1990 she worked as an interior designer and began to paint. Since 1996 she has dedicated her time exclusively to painting.

Since 1997 she is Member of Artists Trade Union of Russia.

In 2000 she was noticed by Alexander Gleser former Soviet dissident, founder of the Museum of Contemporary Russian Art (New Jersey - USA), who included in 2001, 7 of her works in its permanent collection.

In 2003 she was Resident Artist at the International City of the Arts (Paris).

She has done numerous exhibitions in Russia, in the US, in Italy and in France.

== Works ==
Alyona Azernaya is a painter of naïve style.

Through her representational and dreamlike compositions she describes a personal world, where she mixes slavic mythology, Russian traditional tales and biblical narratives. She associates a naïve drawing with skillful use of colors and motives. These deep and generous colors are just like nature which surrounds her and which dominates the majority of her paintings. They are also widely inspired by colors used in the Russian tradition from the inside of the peasant houses, to icones which decorate churches.

== Exhibitions ==
- 1992 Exhibition "Helen" at the Picture gallery, (St. Petersburg, Russia)
- 1993 Exhibition at the House of Art Workers; (Ekaterinburg, Russia)
- 1996 Exhibition at the Ekaterinburg Gallery of Modern Art (Ekaterinburg, Russia)
- 1996 Exhibition at the Picture Gallery, (Krasnovishersk, Russia)
- 1999 Exhibition at the Center Artists House on Crymski Val Street, (Moscow, Russia)
- 1999 Exhibition "Capital" at the Picture Gallery, (Ekaterinburg, Russia)
- 2000 Exhibition "Unseen Russia," Vashon Island, (Washington - USA)
- 2001 Permanent collection at the Museum of Contemporary Russian Art (New Jersey - USA)
- 2001 Exhibition at the Global Art Venue, Seattle, (Washington - USA)
- 2002 Exhibition "Stamens and Pistils" at the Atrium Palace Hotel (Ekaterinburg, Russia)
- 2002 Referencing at the Yessi Ran Collection , (Lakewood, Colorado - USA)
- 2002 Exhibition at the Kronos Gallery, Vashon Island, (Washington - USA)
- 2003 Exhibition at the International City of the Arts (Paris, France).
- 2003 Exhibition "Spring Rhapsody" at the Noah Ark Gallery (Ekaterinburg, Russia)
- 2004 Exhibition at the 3° Biennale of Modern Art at Belyaevo Gallery (Moscow, Russia)
- 2004 Exhibition "Hunting" (with Anna Metelova) Philarmonia (Ekaterinburg, Russia)
- 2005 Exhibition at the Ekaterinburg Gallery of Modern Art (Ekaterinburg, Russia)
- 2005 Exhibition "Russian Still Life", at the Grant Gallery SOHO (New York, NY - USA)
- 2006 Exhibition "Water Signs" (with Anna Metelova) Ekaterinburg Gallery of Modern Art (Ekaterinburg, Russia)
- 2007 Exhibition "Christmas in me" Ekaterinburg Museum of Fine Arts (Ekaterinburg, Russia)
- 2008 Exhibition "Russian traditional tales" Philarmonia (Ekaterinburg, Russia)
- 2009 Exhibition "Genesis" Museum of Sverdlovsk Railways (Ekaterinburg, Russia)
- 2010 Exhibition "Cannes Art Fair" (Cannes, France).

== Gallery ==
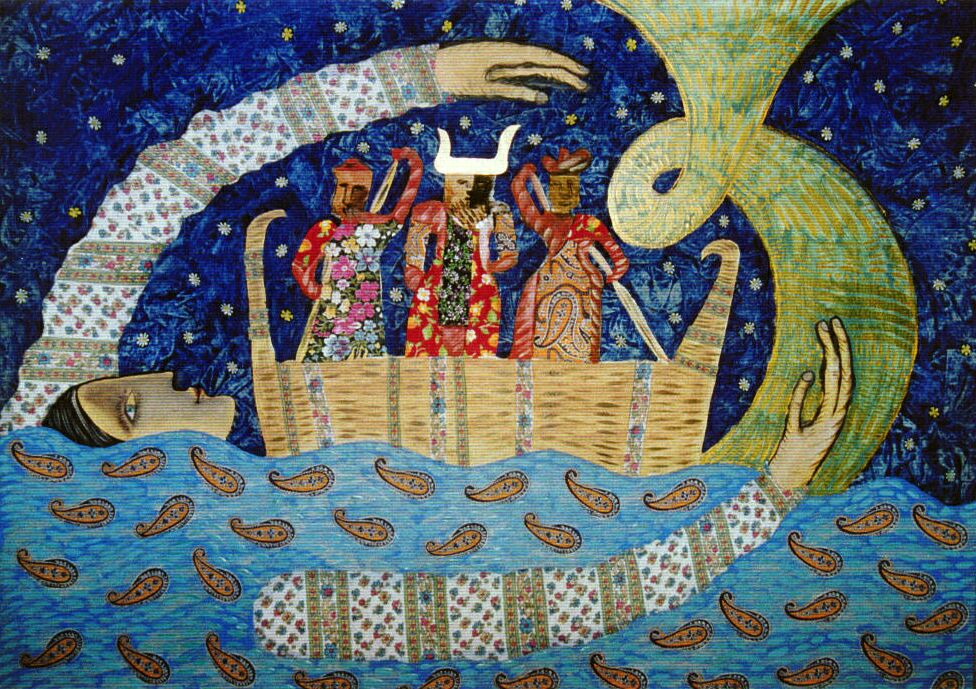
Alyona Azernaya,
Bereginya 2000

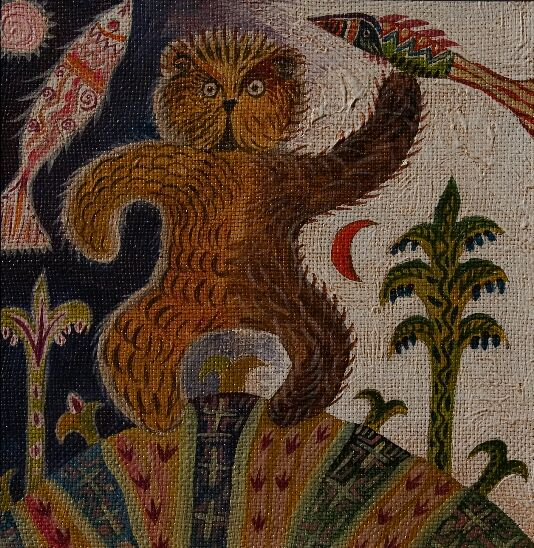
Alyona Azernaya, Bear - the
owner of a wood 2003

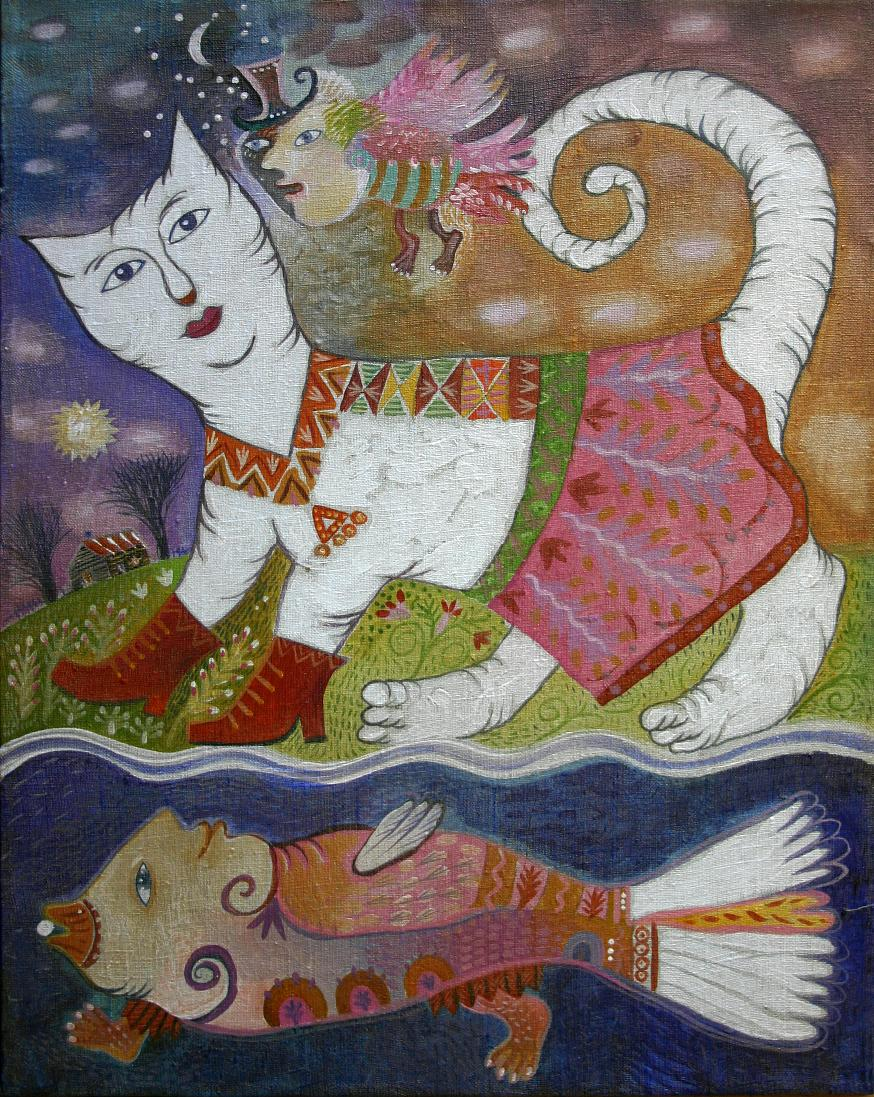
Alyona Azernaya,
Cat in red boots 2003

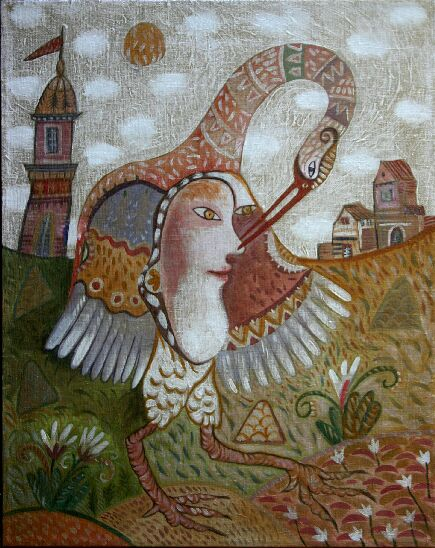
Alyona Azernaya,
Stork 2003

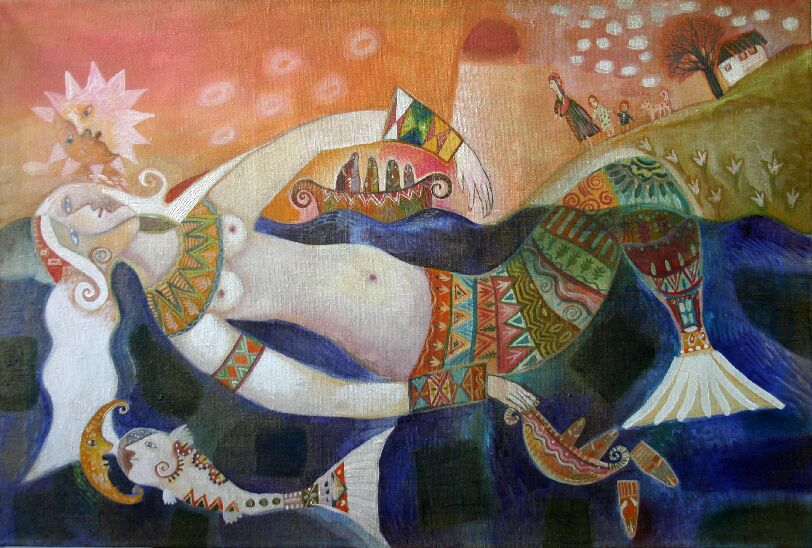
Alyona Azernaya,
The mermaid 2004

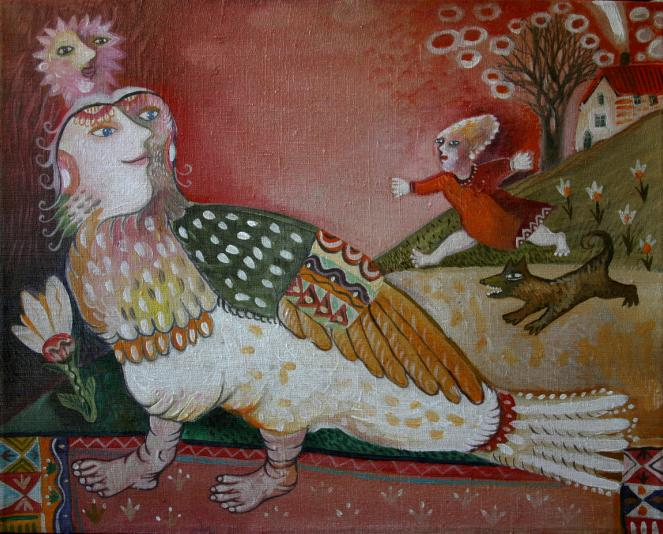
Alyona Azernaya,
Wise bird Sirin 2004

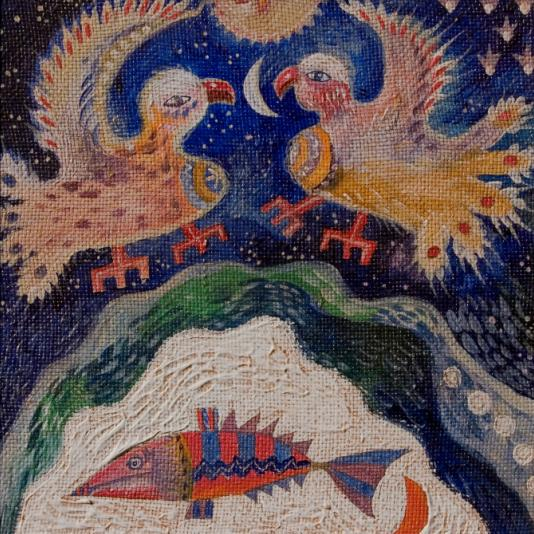
Alyona Azernaya,
Two birds and fish 2005

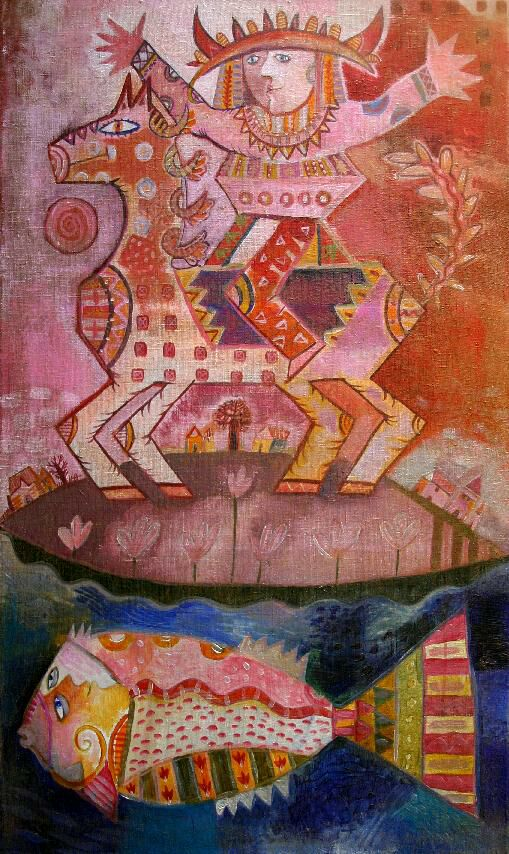
Alyona Azernaya,
Dažbog, 2007

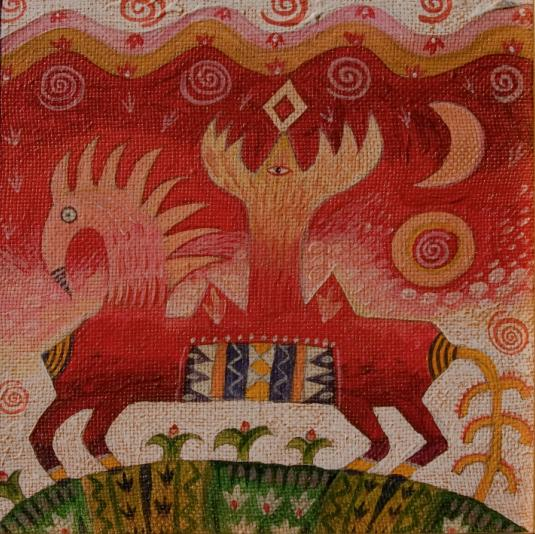
Alyona Azernaya,
The ancient god 2007

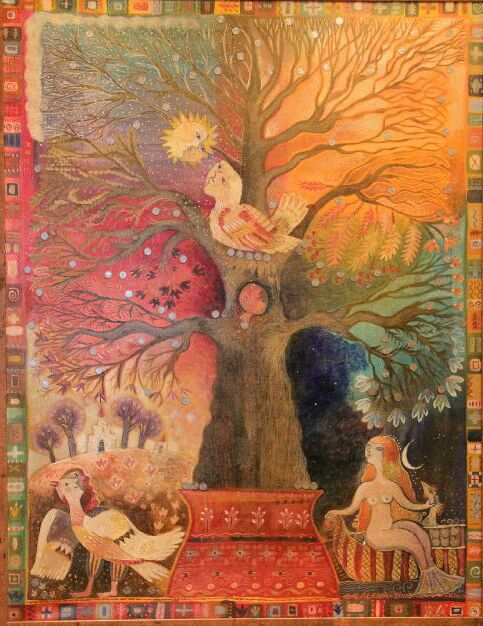
Alyona Azernaya,
Money Tree, 2007

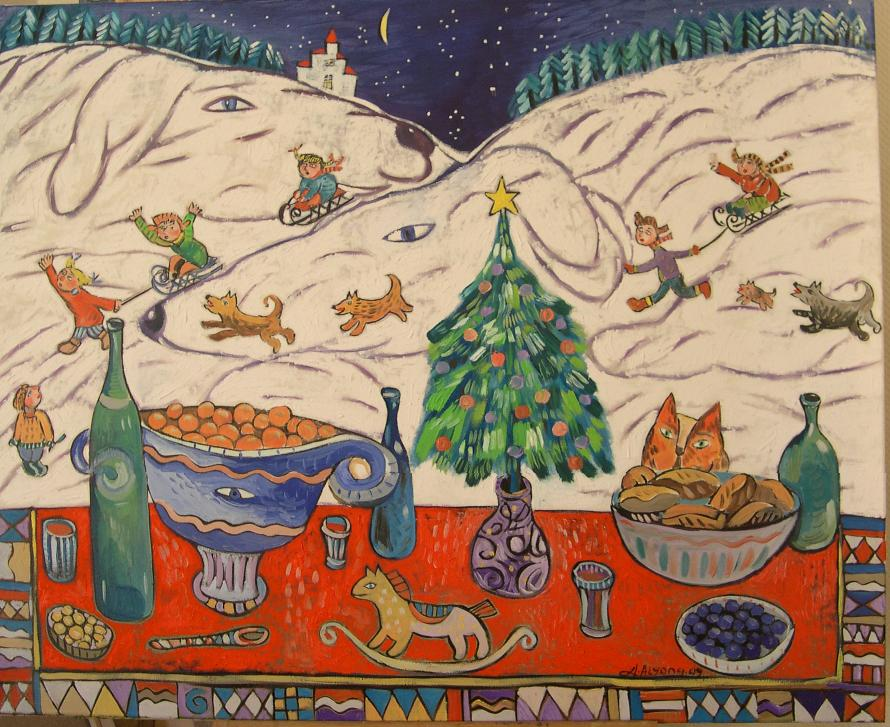
Alyona Azernaya,
Russian winter, 2009

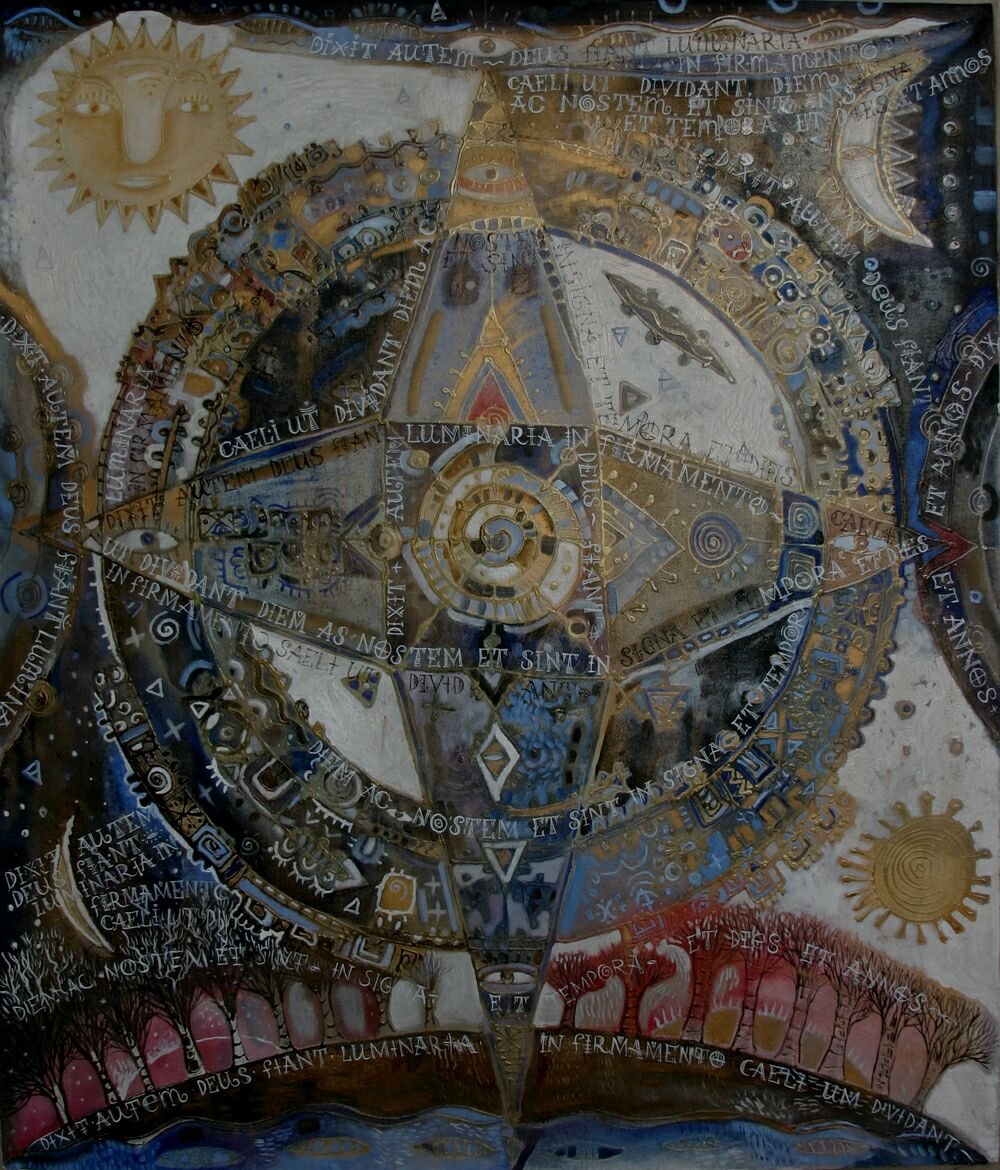
Alyona Azernaya,
Genesis, 2009
