= Dominique-Paul Peyronnet =

French painter (1872–1943)

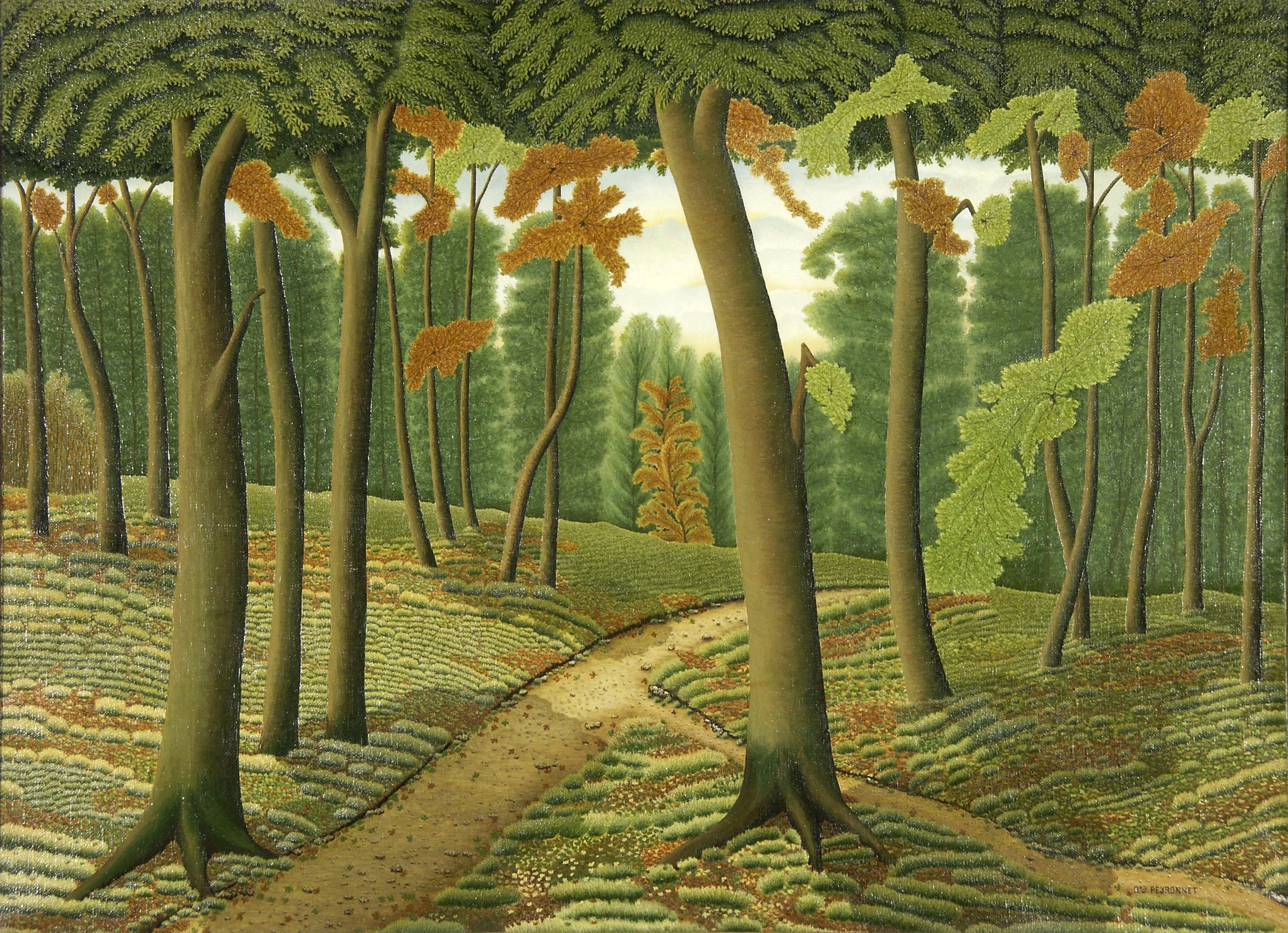
The Forest, oil on canvas

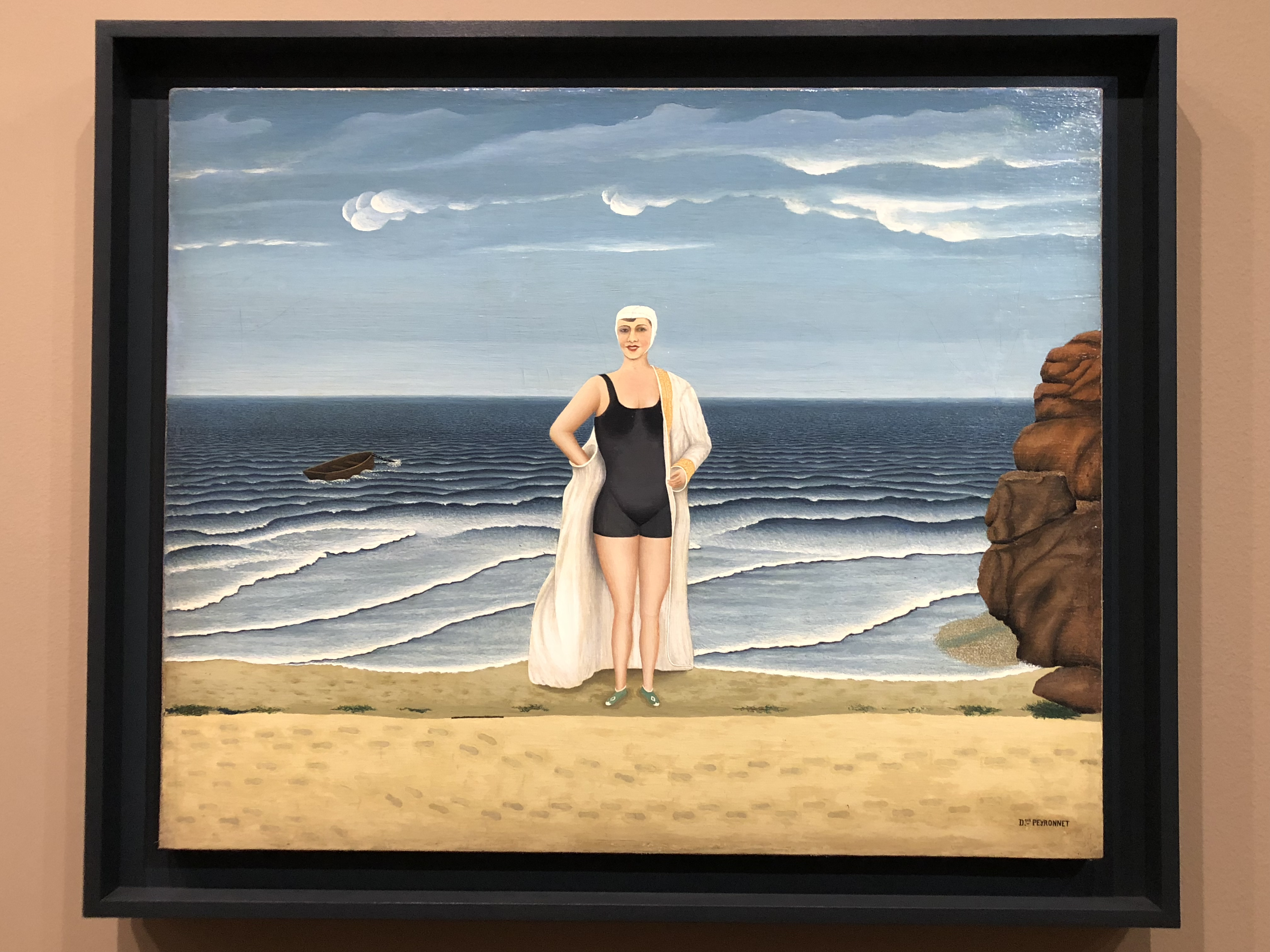
Apres le bain (oil on canvas)

Dominique-Paul Peyronnet (1872–1943) was a French painter.

== Biography ==
Peyronnet was born in Talence, France, in 1872. From 1902, he worked as a printmaker at a lithography business in Paris, until the outbreak of World War I in 1914. He undertook military service during the war, and then began painting in 1920, after retiring from his prior career. He died in 1943 in Paris, France.

== Artwork ==
After retiring in 1920, Peyronnet began to paint landscapes. and exhibited at the Salon des Indépendants between 1932 and 1935. The detailed focus of his canvases and his simplified motifs engendered comparisons with Henri Rousseau and other exponents of naïve art.

Peyronnet is known to have produced around thirty paintings, mostly pastoral and sylvan landscapes, river scenes, and seascapes. His level of detail is contained by bold, linear compositional structures to produce a taut yet placid mood. Ferryman of the Moselle won the Paul Guillaume prize in 1936. Peyronnet drew on his own experience of war to produce a resonant and poetic image.

His works are today in the collections of the Museum of Modern Art, New York; Musée d'Art et d'Archéologie, Senlis; Musée Maillol, Paris; Sammlung Zander, Cologne, and others.
