= Charles Callins =

Australian naïve painter

- Charles Callins c1968
- Born: Charles John Newcombe Callins; 1887; Hughenden, Queensland
- Died: 1982 (aged 94–95)
- Occupation: Painter
- Years active: 1953–1980
- Known for: Naïve art
- Spouse: Helen Callins

Charles Callins was an Australian naïve painter from Queensland.

He started painting in his sixties after retiring from a lifetime working as a compositor in the printing rooms of various newspapers. He is best known for his paintings of the coastlines around Cairns, North Queensland. His maritime paintings are characterised by unusual distortions of perspective and aerial viewpoints. Callins gained commercial and critical attention in the 1960s through his association with the contemporary art gallery Gallery A, in Sydney. John Olsen has praised Callins for his "wild eyed innocence" and his "wonderful sensibility of being Australian". Works by Callins are held in the permanent collections of the National Gallery of Australia and the Queensland Art Gallery.

== Biography ==
Charles Callins was born in 1887 at a railway camp in Hughenden, Queensland, where his father was a worker on the Great Northern Railway. In 1891, his mother relocated Callins and his younger sister to Cairns, following the disappearance of his father for unknown reasons. At age 12, Callins left school and took on a position as an office boy working for the Cairns Times, then subsequently The Trinity Times. For the period up until World War I, he worked for several other Queensland newspapers as a compositor working on the printing press. Leaving home for the first time, he accepted a lucrative job offer which saw him move from Cairns to Atherton to work for the Atherton Examiner. While residing there he played cricket and football for Atherton. Later he moved again to Herberton and worked for the Wild River Times. In Herberton he took up competitive swimming and running.

Callins returned to Cairns again, and there he won sufficient prize money from a running competition to buy a block of land for his mother. To finance the construction of a worker's dwelling, he returned to his old employer to work as a foreman. Throughout the period until 1912, Callins was also involved in competitive sailing. From prize money, he and a friend constructed an eighteen-foot yacht, the Thelma, which they completed in 1909. They went on to sail the Thelma in many winning races.

Charles Callins enlisted in the Australian Imperial Forces in 1916 under the name Charles John Callins and served in the 52nd Battalion. He was given a position in the barracks' cookhouse prior to shipping out to England. After arriving in Plymouth he was injured in an accident, and subsequently developed a life-threatening bout of bronchitis. When he was released from hospital he returned to the cookhouse briefly. After collapsing in the grounds one day, he was deemed unfit to serve on the frontline in France. He was discharged in 1918 and sent back to Australia aboard a ship from Belfast.

On his return he was offered a veteran's pension, but instead returned to newspaper employment at the Cairns Post. During the return journey from England, Callins wrote a letter proposing marriage to Helen Anderson, a Scottish woman he had courted whilst a soldier there. Anderson traveled to Cairns and the pair married at St. Andrew's Presbyterian Church in November 1920. They had four children, two born in Cairns, and two born later in Brisbane.

In 1922 Callins was commissioned by the Cairns Post to write a series of nine articles on the history of sailing around Cairns. As he was an employee of the paper, the articles were published under the pseudonym 'Prudence'. The subjects covered included sea rescues, the history of sailing ships, and the leisure activities of various sailing clubs. In 1926 Callins moved with his family to Paddington, Brisbane. He took up employment with The Telegraph, mounting photo-zinc plates. He remained active in athletics and sailing and joined a mouth organ band which played on radio.

Callins sustained a major injury in a workplace accident in 1937. He was hit on the head by a piece of lead equipment that had become airborne. He was treated in hospital, but a fortnight later collapsed in a blackout. For the following four years he suffered from frequent headaches. The matter was taken to court and Callins was granted compensation. He continued working six days a week up until 1947, when he retired under his doctor's advice. He was advised to concentrate on water exercises and so became a voluntary swimming instructor at the Ithaca Swimming Pool.

In the early 1950s Charles Calling took up painting. He died in 1982 at the age of 95. He had occasionally been receiving treatment for cancer at the Queensland Radium Institute.

== Career as a painter ==
If I don't paint Green Island and the Barrier Reef I will die and take the story with me.

— Charles Callins

Charles Callins was first inspired to paint some time around 1951 following an incident where he saved a woman school teacher who was falling off a boat. He made a pencil sketch of the incident and was pleased with the result. Soon afterwards he decided to make a painting of Green Island, declaring to his wife "If I don't paint Green Island and the Barrier Reef I will die and take the story with me". Callins, unsure of what to make of his own creations, took some works to a local school and received encouragement from some teachers who told him to never stop painting. Thereafter Callins continued painting and sporadically entered local competitions over the next two decades.

Brisbane gallery owner Brian Johnstone, after seeing Callins' paintings, offered the artist his first solo exhibition in 1957. In 1966 Laurie Thomas, the director of the Queensland Art Gallery, suggested to Max Hutchinson of Sydney's Gallery A to consider exhibiting Charles Callins' paintings. His paintings were exhibited there the next year, beginning a long association between Callins and Gallery A in which sales were frequent and collectors eagerly awaited new works. They were a source of inspiration for fellow artists and arts administrators; being acquired into the private collections of Jon Molvig, John Firth-Smith, Clifton Pugh, Roy and Betty Churcher, Tony Coleing, Janet Dawson, Barry Humphries, as well as by the Queensland Art Gallery and the National Gallery of Australia. Callins also gifted many of his paintings to public bodies such as colleges, charitable associations, hospitals, and also to celebrities. In 1973 he went to lengths to gift a painting to Princess Anne and Mark Phillips for their wedding. Gallery A facilitated the presentation and transportation to London and it was happily accepted by the princess. In 1977, for Charles Callins' 90th birthday, a retrospective of 49 works were exhibited at Gallery A.

== Subjects, technique and style ==
A significant portion of the paintings of Charles Callins illustrate the landscapes and coastlines around North Queensland. In particular Fitzroy Island, Mission Bay, Cairns Harbour, and Green Island. They are autobiographical in the sense they were informed by memories of his sailing days when he lived in Cairns. A strong sense of the tropical North Queensland identity is often conveyed in his works through the inclusion of endemic flora and fauna; trees, kangaroos, orchids, birdlife. Callins is described as a birdlover. Works such as Unspoiled Beauty and Massacre, the latter showing the bulldozing of koala habitat, reflect the conservationist views of the artist. Callins also painted contemporary and historical public events, such as swimming carnivals, beauty competitions, and visits of the British royal family to Queensland.

Beautiful Day (1965) held at the Queensland Art Gallery. Charles Callins combined multiple perspectives into the same compositions. Here an aerial view is combined with a frontal view.

Callins has been described as an archivist and an amateur historian who loves the details of history. He always accompanied his large paintings with elaborate handwritten notes, and in works illustrating public events, newspaper clippings. These were often stuck to the rear of the composition board. It is likely that his foray into painting was only ever intended to serve a secondary purpose; to provide illustrations for his written records. In his seascapes, Callins would note down aspects such as his family association with the place illustrated, its geographical position, the time of day, as well as providing navigational advice on the hazards present in the water.

Author Geoffrey Lehmann describes Charles Callins as an excellent colourist. Callins was aware of how to mix colours from his experience as a compositor working on newspaper printing. With the exception of his series of rose paintings, he used predominantly pastel shades. When painting the sea he would use different intensities of colour to indicate water depth. His seas are accentuated by little waves; strokes of white paint like sparkling wood shavings. Callins always painted the sky in first. His clouds are depicted as close and palpable, as if nearby sheep. Callins avoided painting shadows, holding the opinion that shadows would put unwanted darkness into his compositions.

Callins' first works were painted in house paints that he had left over in a cupboard. Afterwards he painted in oil, as "no man who loves the sea would paint in anything else"; watercolours would be easily destroyed by moisture. Susceptibility to damage also caused Callins to shift from painting on canvas to painting on masonite. The artist wanted to ensure his memories would last the test of time.

One of the most characteristic aspects of Charles Callins' works is his complete ignorance of the established conventions of perspective. Art critic James Gleeson considered the chief delight in appreciating Callins' paintings to be the way the artist invents his own solutions to technical problems of representation. In an exhibition review, Gleeson wrote that Callins "paints as if he had never seen a painting in his life". Like other naïve painters, Callins improvised his own way of transmitting lived experience into pictorial images. The results of which are either ingenious, beautifully direct, or so "devastatingly oblivious to the long established conventions that one feels an almost irresistible urge to laugh".

Charles Callins's paintings have been described as employing a "bold and adventurous use of perspective and dimensions". He appears to have given no thought for comparative sizes and seems only vaguely aware of technical problems. Explaining this, he said "the perspective is in my own mind". In some paintings huge birds dominate over landscapes, in another, a foreground theatre audience appears as tiny figures before a giant person towering over them on stage. In Callins' seascapes, horizon lines are seldom straight, but instead are looped around the paintings as if showing the curvature of the Earth from a great height. James Gleeson noted that the curved horizon perfectly conveys the effect of instability caused by a ship's movements, whilst another critic found Callins does well in capturing the rise and fall of tides and the tang of sea-spray. Australian artist John Firth-Smith, a collector of marine paintings, was influenced in his early works by Charles Callins. Firth-Smith compares the awkward shapes and forms in Callins' paintings to those found in abstract art and Aboriginal art.

Callins would also combine multiple perspectives into the same composition. In one work, a Queenslander house is depicted to show multiple verandahs from a combination of a frontal and an aerial view. In another, a swimming carnival is depicted from an aerial view, with the audience in frontal view flattened out onto its side. Distortions of perspective were also used to show what lay around the corner of a headland or behind and island. Callins' seascapes are characteristically painted from a gull's eye aerial view, while boats within the scene are depicted from a different perspective; sideways and upside down, bouncing around, tipping and tilting in a quilted effect. The high vantage point of the artist's seascape paintings is perhaps attributed to his working method; to paint he leaned over masonite that was laid flat on his table.

== Selected exhibitions ==
- Johnstone Gallery, Brisbane (1957)
- Gallery A, Melbourne & Sydney (1967)
- The White Studio Gallery, Adelaide (1968)
- Gallery A, Sydney (1970)
- Powell Street Gallery, Melbourne (1971)
- Institute of Modern Art, Brisbane (1976)
- Gallery A, Sydney (1977)
- Powell Street Gallery, Melbourne (1978)
- Powell Street Gallery, Melbourne (1981)
- Swan Hill Regional Art Gallery, Swan Hill (2004)
- Campbelltown Arts Centre, Sydney (2009)

== Sources ==
- Warner, Sandra (1994), Australian Naive Art, Craftsman House, ISBN 976-8097-53-1
- Lehmann, Geoffrey (1977), Australian primitive painters, University of Queensland Press, ISBN 978-0-7022-1039-6
- Fay, Peter (2009), "'To the Ladies and Max': Charles Callins at Gallery A Sydney", in Murphy, John (ed.), Gallery A Sydney 1964–1983, Campbelltown Arts Centre, pp. 135–142, ISBN 978-1-875199-67-9
