= Konstantin Rodko =

Konstantin Rodko (24 August 1908 – 30 September 1995) was a Latvian painter who was based in the United States. Rodko's parents were Belarusian and Estonian. He married his first wife in Latvia and had four children. During World War II they had lived in Germany until they were able to leave from Bremerhaven on 19 August 1950 on the USS General Harry Taylor, and arrived in New York City four days later. It was in America his painting talents came to prominence and sold them on the streets of New York. Rodko lived in Brooklyn with his children and then divorced his first wife and remarried a woman by the name of Kate Dennison. She too was a painter and the couple sold their works alongside each other.

They moved to Sea Cliff, Long Island, a close neighbor to Glen Cove. There he lived on the second floor of a Russian school. His second wife made many miniature paintings and Rodko painted his best works there. He would sell and give paintings as gifts to his four children. He also loved to play and listen to Russian gypsy music and folk music, paint Russian scenes and speak Russian, which is why many thought he was Russian. He was a multi-instrumentalist, and Kate was a tailor who loved her cats. She considered the animals as her children (she never had children with Rodko) but she adopted his children from his previous relationship. Rodko had seven grandchildren and two great-grandchildren. Toward the end of the 1980s, Rodko moved to Brentwood, Long Island until Kate died of a stroke in 1984.

Rodko then returned to Glen Cove where he met his third wife in the house she owned, and he rented the upstairs apartment. It was that home in a small basement that his last art studio existed. He became sick and also had a stroke which led to his death in 1995.

Unfortunately, the paintings that he left in the home were sold off and never given to his children but works are in private collections with his family. He is survived by two daughters that live in New England and two sons that live in Florida. Many of his grandchildren and great-grand children still live in the New York area.
