= Petar Grgec =

Petar Grgec (27 January 1933 – 2 August 2006) was a Croatian naïve artist.

== Biography ==
Grgec was born in Kloštar Podravski in the region of Podravina, Kingdom of Yugoslavia (present-day Croatia).

Grgec graduated from the Civil Engineering Polytechnic in Pula in 1952. In 1953 he first exhibited his works at the Engineers Corps Art Section Show in Karlovac where he came on his military service and settled. Since 1958 he had been an active painter producing oils on glass, canvas, watercolours and drawings. He had over 30 solo exhibitions and took part in over 300 group shows in Croatia and abroad. He was a member and co-founder of the association of Croatian Naïve Artists and a member of the Roman Academy I 500. His works are in the Henri Rousseau Museum in Laval, Museum of Contemporary Religious Art in Vatican City, Metropolitan Museum in Manila, Art Museum in São Paulo, Croatian Museum of Naive Art in Zagreb and elsewhere around the world. He lived and worked in Karlovac.

== Sources ==
- The Miracle Of Croatian Naïve Art by Ratko Vince, Josip Depolo, Ivan Rogič Nehajev (Zagreb 1996)
