= Jan Bacur =

Serbian painter

Jan Bacur is a naive painter of Slovak origin. He was born October 22, 1937, in Padina, a village near Kovačica, Serbia. Bacur is a member of the Kovačica Naïve Art Gallery.

== Biography ==
Bacur was born the child of farmers. In his childhood he was fascinated by painting and developed his talent in the secondary school Kovačica. There, as a schoolboy he saw the works of famous naive, and this gave encouraged him to continue in that direction. He participated in a group exhibition in Padina, at the age of 13 years. In October 1962, he exhibited as a guest at the Kovačica Naïve Art Gallery for the first time. In 1985 he became a full member of the Gallery. Since then he has mounted 28 individual exhibitions in Serbia and abroad, and was also a participant in many gatherings of artists.

== Work ==
Bacur's work concentrates on the roads and fields of his native hills. The accuracy of the rural architecture of his native country is remarkable. His paintings reflect the conserved and ancient traditions, the beauty and spirit of old times. The spirit of citizenship is still clearly indicated on the Slovak national costume of the people portrayed.
