= Hafida Zizi =

Moroccan painter and sculptor (born 1976)

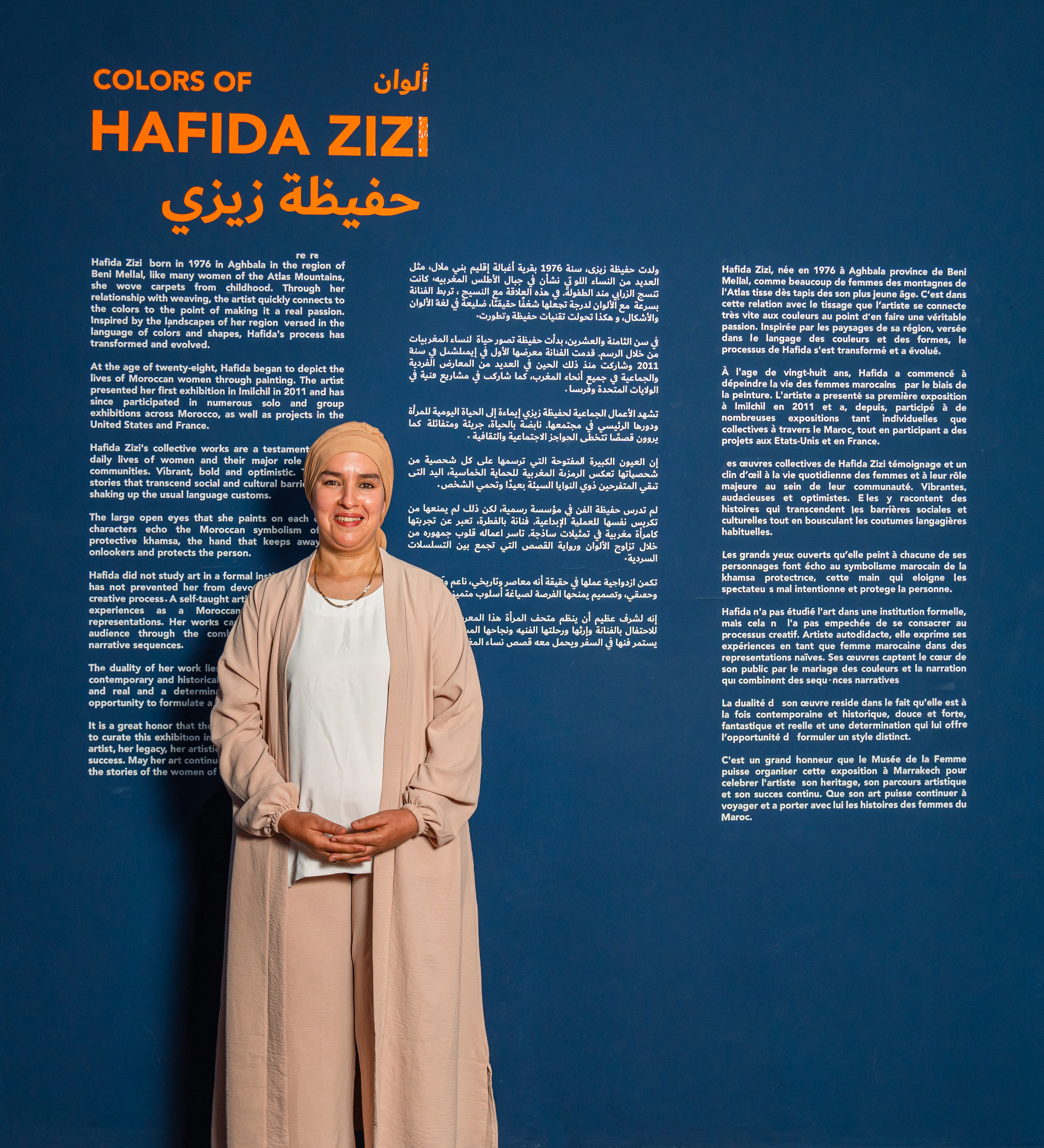
- Zizi in 2025
- Born: May 25, 1976 (age 49); Aghbala, Morocco
- Occupations: Painter; Sculptor

Hafida Zizi (born May 25, 1976) is a Moroccan painter and sculptor. She is known for her naïve and often colorful art, in which she depicts the lives of Amazigh women.

== Life and career ==
Hafida Zizi was born in 1976 in Aghbala, a town in the Middle Atlas, and grew up in a traditional Amazigh community. Her mother was a carpet weaver, which brought Zizi into early contact with artistic crafts and the use of color. From ages seven to fifteen Zizi attended school, but was interrupted in her education when she was married. She spent the following years with the traditional chores of a housewife and became a mother to three children. Following the death of her mother, who had been a central figure in Zizi's life, and being unhappy with this way of life, she decided to separate from her husband and moved to Marrakesh to live with one of her brothers.

At the age of 28, Hafida Zizi began her career as a self-taught painter and sculptor. Her first solo exhibition took place seven years later, in 2011, in Imilchil. It was followed by further exhibitions in cities such as Casablanca and Marrakesh in Morrocco, as well as international projects in the US, France and Spain. Since 2015 Hafida Zizi has been running a gallery in the UNESCO World Heritage Site of Aït Benhaddou. In 2024, she opened another gallery in Marrakesh.

As of 2025 Zizi's works have been displayed in numerous solo and group exhibitions in Morocco and internationally. Between March 2023 and April 2024, as well as from November 2024 to June 2026, the Musée de la Femme in Marrakesh dedicates its temporary exhibition to Hafida Zizi.

== Style and influences ==
Hafida Zizi is a self-taugh artist and received no formal training. Her painting style is known for its naïvety and the intense use of color.

Zizi's art focuses on the lives of Moroccan women, especially the daily experiences of the Amazigh women, and their central role for their communities. She often chooses classic motifs, such as scenes depicting the preparation and eating of food, music and dance. These narrative sequences are typical for Zizi's artwork. A recurring motif, central to her style, are large open eyes, reminiscent of the protective Hamsa, the hand that wards of evil glances.

Her works are characterized by a combination of contemporary and historical elements that are described as both soft and strong, fantastical and realistic.

Zizi paints on canvas and also works with sculpture - jugs, vases and lamps are typical objects for her.

Important role models for Hafida Zizi are the artist Chaïbia Talal and Saladi.
