= Raphael Perez =

Israeli artist (born 1965)

- רפאל פרץ
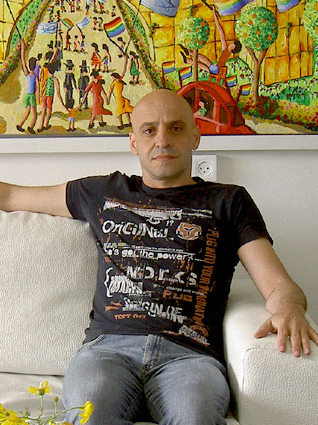
- Born: 1965 (age 59–60); Jerusalem, Israel
- Known for: Naive Art

Raphael "Rafi" Perez (Hebrew: רפי פרץ; born 1965) is an Israeli artist known for his homoerotic gay art and colorful urban landscapes painted in a naïve style.

== Early life ==
Perez was born in Jerusalem. Growing up, he was exposed to the works of great painters by his father. He has two brothers – one an industrial designer (his twin), and the other a jewelry designer. He served in the Israel Defense Forces in the Artillery Corps. Perez only began to paint at the age of 23. In 1989–1992, he studied art at the College of Visual Arts in Beersheba. Since 1995, he has been working and living in Tel Aviv.

For 15 years, Perez worked as a counselor at a youth shelter, and a pre-school sports and art teacher.

== Art career ==
Perez paints urban landscapes in a naïve style, depicting life in the city streets, parks, and public places in a palette of bright colors. Many of his works are grouped by series – men and women, gay families, spherical paintings of Tel Aviv and Jerusalem as multi-cultural centers. His early work focused on human relationships, sometimes using flowers as a metaphor. Perez's artistic career began when he was still living with women. He often painted heterosexual couples, but even then, one discerned Perez's inner conflicts and attempt to grapple with the complexities of couplehood.

In 2010, Perez was commissioned to create advertising posters for the Israel Ministry of Tourism. His posters of Tel Aviv appeared on billboards in the London underground, shopping malls, and bus stops, and his designs were featured on 30,000 transportation card holders distributed in London. He describes his art as "a reflection of the entire gay community – people in the closet, mature love, gay families, gay political icons and cultural icons". Major influences on his work are Nahum Gutman and David Hockney.

Perez's work was described in The London Magazine as "instantly appealing, bursting with exuberance and energy". According to the Jerusalem Post, Perez is a "Tel Aviv artist in every sense of the word – painting the urban landscape of the city… infused with happiness".

With the Israeli poet Smadar Sharett, Perez created three books of paintings and poems that have been published in 2021.

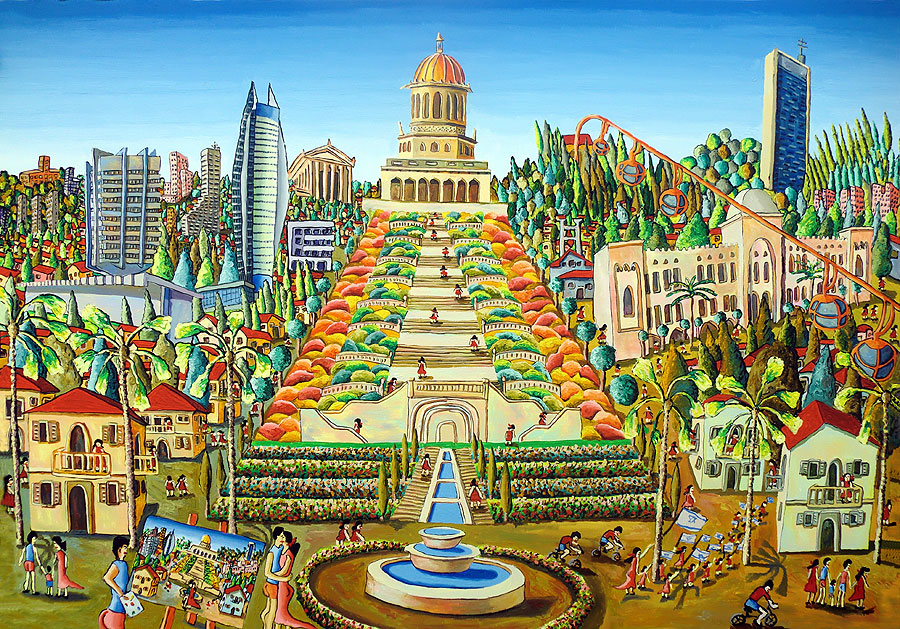

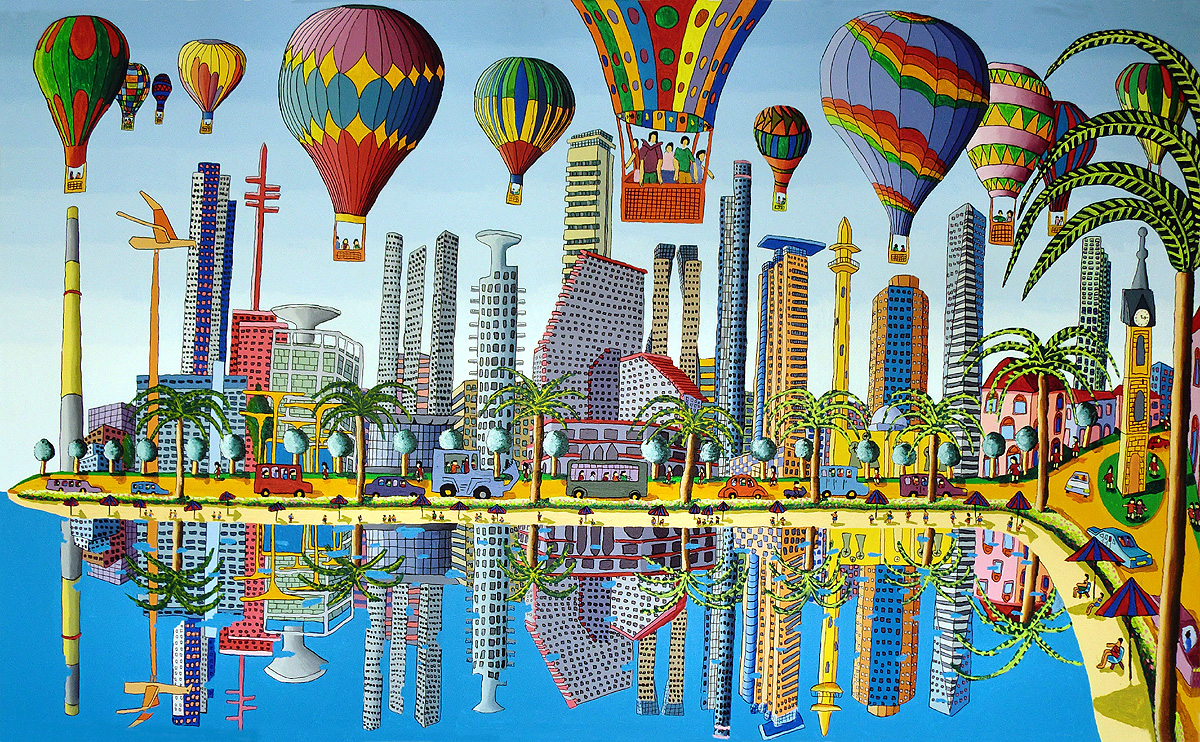

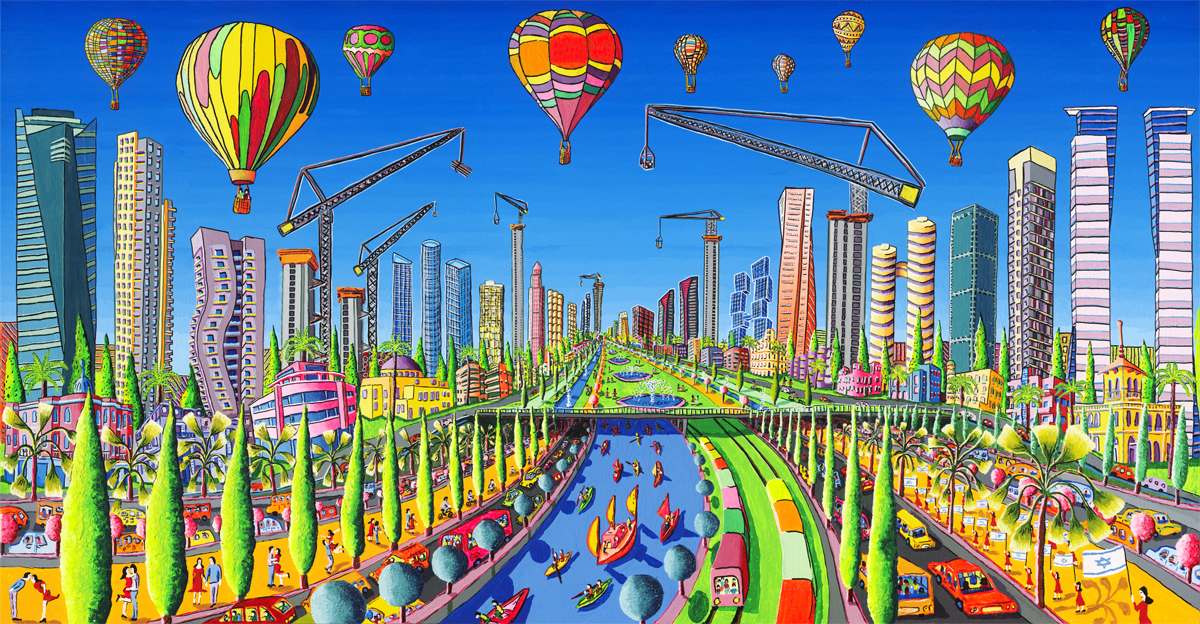

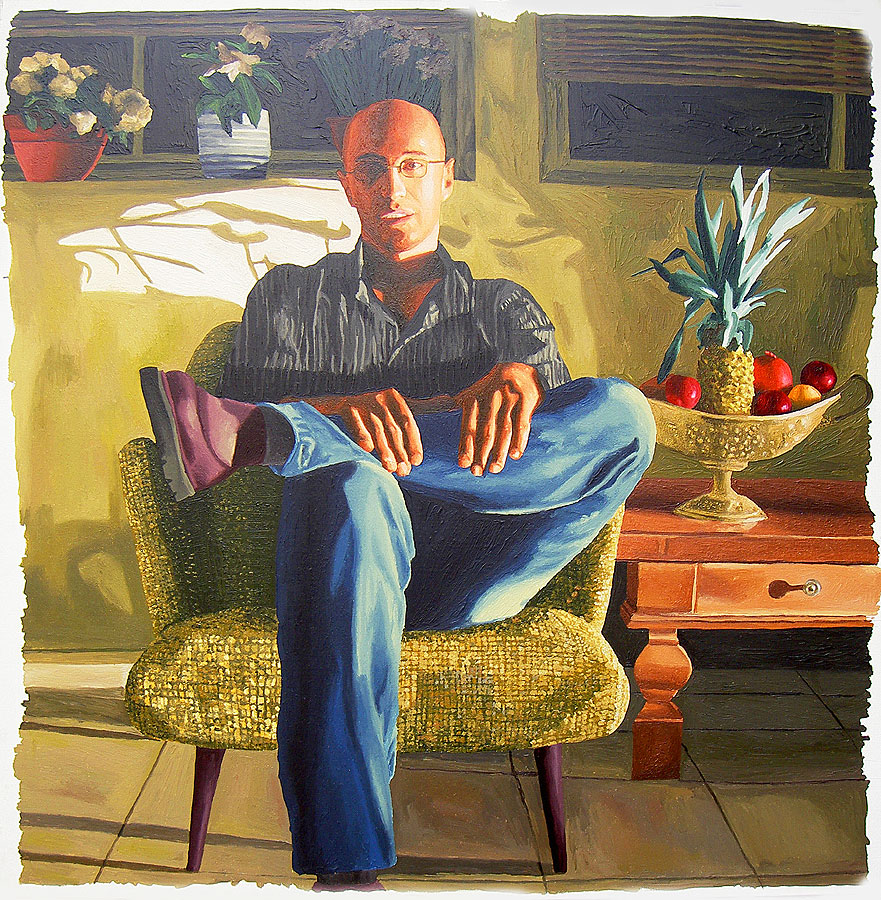

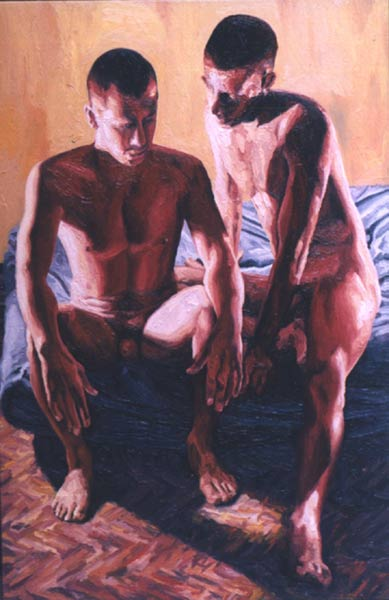

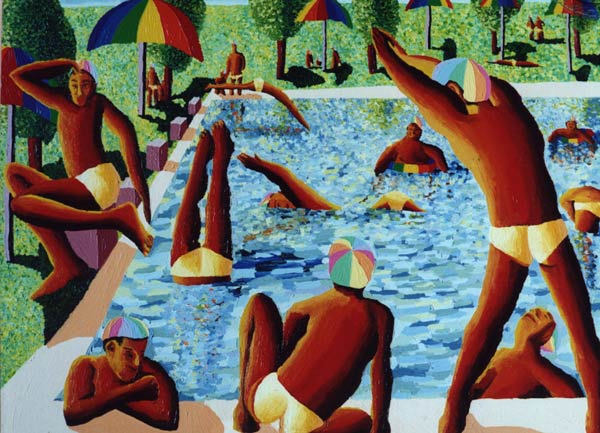

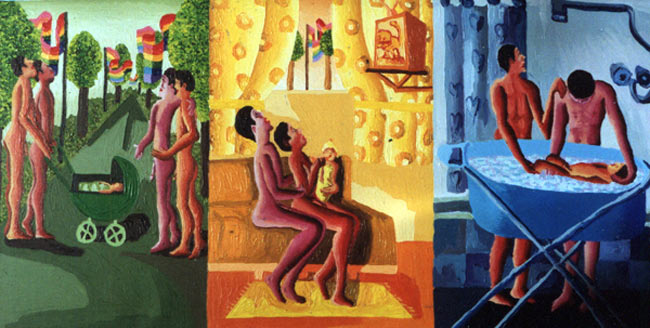

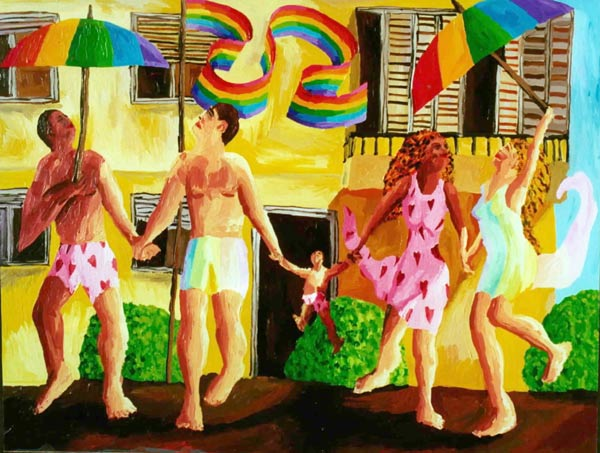

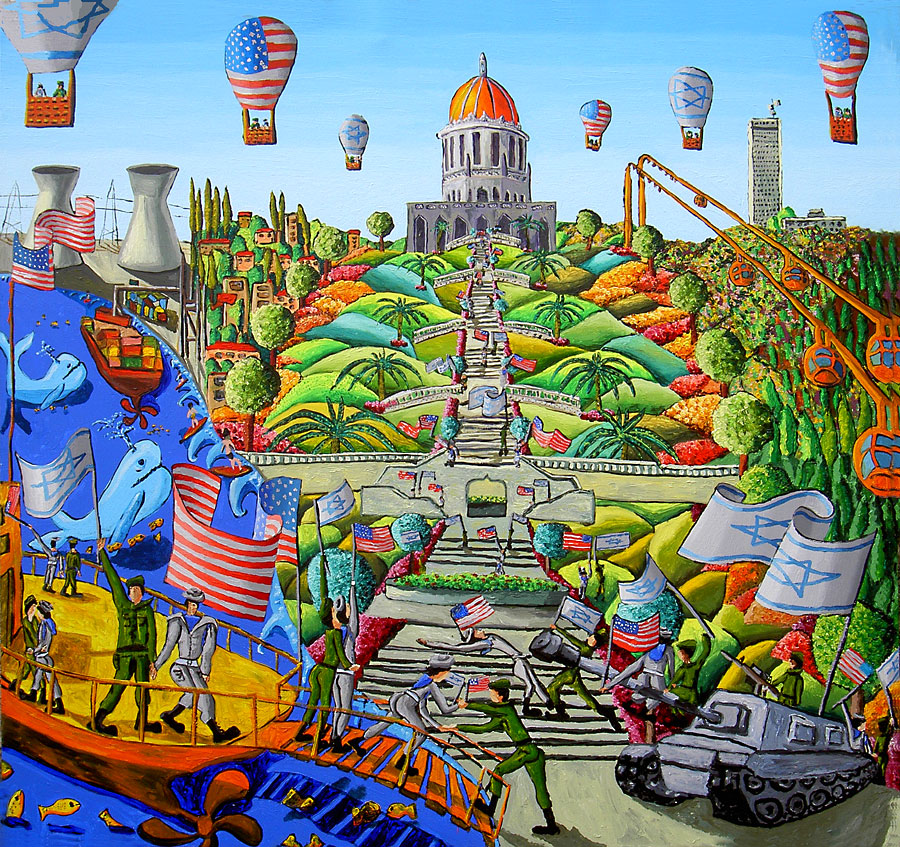

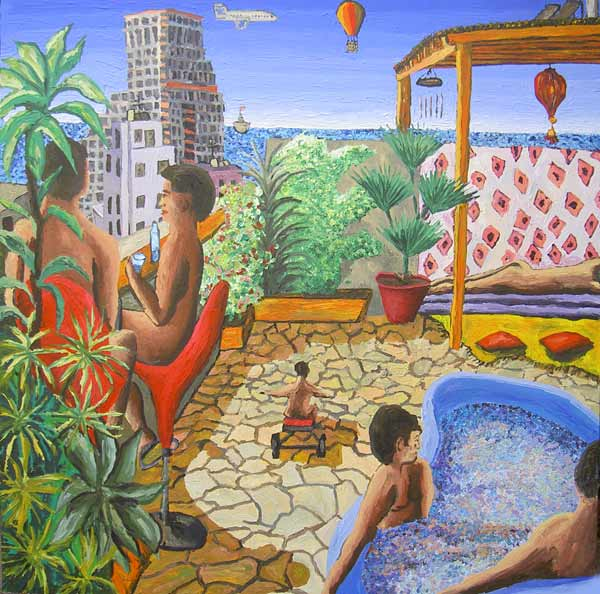

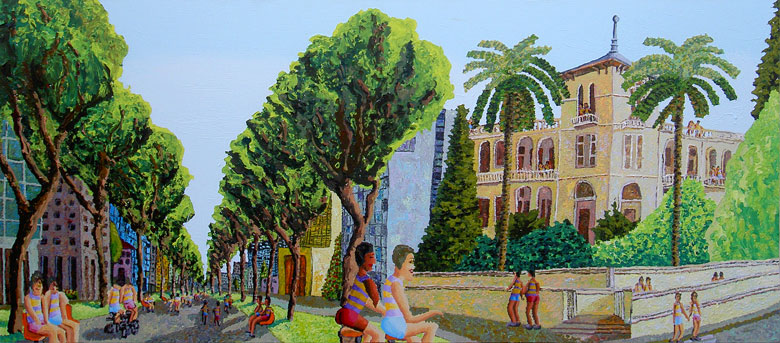

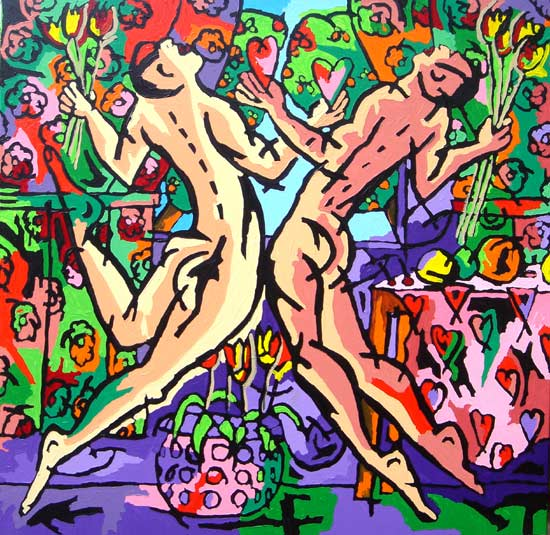

== Personal life ==
Peretz is openly gay and in a relationship since 2013 with Assaf Henigsberg, who also served as a model for some of his paintings.

== Selected solo exhibitions ==
- The Kiss, Zaritsky Artists House, Tel Aviv – December 18, 2008
- Army of lovers, Janco Dada Museum, Ein Hod – 2009
- Zaritsky Artists House, Tel Aviv – 2008
- Zaritsky Artists House, Tel Aviv – 2006

== Selected group exhibitions ==
- Art Workshop Gallery, Yavne – 2017
- Minus One Galley – 2017
- Umm al-Fahm Art Gallery – 2014
- Sommer Contemporary Art – 2010
- Office Gallery – 2008
- Joseph Weisman Municipal Art Gallery, Givatayim – 2008
- Zaritsky Artists House, Tel Aviv – 2007
- Tel Aviv Museum of Art – 2003

== Permanent exhibits ==
- Since 2018, at The Chaim Rosenberg School of Jewish Studies (Tel Aviv University)
- Since 2016, at The International Convention Center (Jerusalem)

== See also ==
- Visual arts in Israel
