= Vasily Romanenkov =

Russian naïve artist (1953-2013)

Vasily Tikhonovich Romanenkov (Russian: 'Василий Тихонович Романенков; 1953–2013), was a Russian naïve artist of the Soviet and post-Soviet periods.

== Biography ==
Vasily Romanenkov was born in the village of Bogdanovka in Smolensk Oblast). In 1968 he graduated from 8-years school and moved to “Kosino” State farm near Moscow to live with his mother. There he apprenticed as a carpenter. In 1975–1980 Romanenkov studied at ZNUI (eng. Distance Learning National University of Arts) under N. Pavlov and N. Rotanov. The main feature of his art - a manner to draw with small strokes of different thicknesses, creating a kind of "moire" texture with the help of a pencil. Initially, Romanenkov tried to paint in oils, but on the advice of his teachers at ZNUI he engaged himself with the graphics. His first compositions, which he began to paint from the bottom, were distinguished with randomness of different shapes and patterns. Later, his works became more structured and gained the cyclic format, thus consisting of three or more separate works, each with its internal frame. His cycles are devoted to Romanenkov's own biography, birth, baptism and death; the fate of the Ancient and Modern Russia. Vasily Romanenkov is widely known in Russia and abroad. He was awarded the Grand Prix at the International Triennial of Naive Art in Bratislava (Insita) at 2004 and received an honorable mention of the jury at the same exhibition in 1994 and 1997.

== Personal exhibitions ==
- Evidence. Tsaritsyno State Museum, 1998
- Naive Art. Vasily Romanenkov. From the collection of Ksenia Bogemskaya, Central House of Artists, Moscow, 2002

== Exhibitions ==
- All-Union Exhibition of works of amateur artists, dedicated to the XVII Congress of Trade Unions, Moscow, 1982
- Folk traditions, Moscow, 1986–1987
- The image and perception, Moscow, 1990
- Dream of Gold, Center for Contemporary Art, Moscow, 1992
- Insita 94, 97, 2000, 2004
- Naive Art of Russia, Moscow 1997, 1998
- Wisdom is with the naive eyes, The Vasnetsov Brothers Art Museum, 1997
- Naive art in the collection of K. Bogemskaya and A. Turchin, "Ark" exhibition hall, Moscow, 1998
- Pushkin images, Moscow, 1999
- Mastery of time, Gallery of the International University, Moscow, 2000
- Galerie Hamer, Amsterdam, 1998
- Naive art, 1998
- Outsiders, Galerie Hamer, Amsterdam, 1999
- Erste Begegnung (Germany), 1999
- Russische Naieven vertellen, Museum de Stadshof, Zwolle, the Netherlands, 2000
- Outsider's Art Fair, 2001–2004
- Festnaiv’04
- Art Manege Fair, Moscow, 2004
- The Museum of everything, Garage Center for Contemporary Culture, Moscow, 2013
- Outsider Art Fair, Paris, 2014
- Art brut // collection abcd, Expo Collective Contemporaine (collection of Bruno Decharme), 2014-2015
- Outsider Art Fair, Hôtel le A, Paris 2014

== Collections ==
- Tsaritsyno State Museum
- Zander Collection, Cologne, Germany
- Museum of Outsider Art, Moscow
- Museum of Naïve Art, Moscow
- Collection ABDC, Paris
- Collection Eternod-Mermod, Lausanne

== Bibliography ==
- Vasily Romanenkov, Certificates, 1998
- Amateurish art // Amateur art: A Short History (1960–1990), Saint Petersburg, 1999
- Pushkin's images in the works of naive artists of Russia: Catalog / M., 1999;
- Erste Begegnung mit der Russische Naive, Museum Charlotte Zander. Schloss Boennigheim, 1999;
- James Young. Whispers from the Universe: Vasiliy Romanenkov, Raw Vision #61
- Outsiders, Galerie Hamer, Amsterdam, 1999
- Raw Vision publications
- К. Богемская. Понять примитив. Самодеятельное, наивное и аутсайдерское искусство в XX веке. СПб.: Алетейя, 2001
- К. Богемская. В. Романенков (archive, not published)
- К. Богемская. Наивные художники России (Russian Naive and Outsider Artists), СПб.:Алетейя, 2009
