= Guido Vedovato =

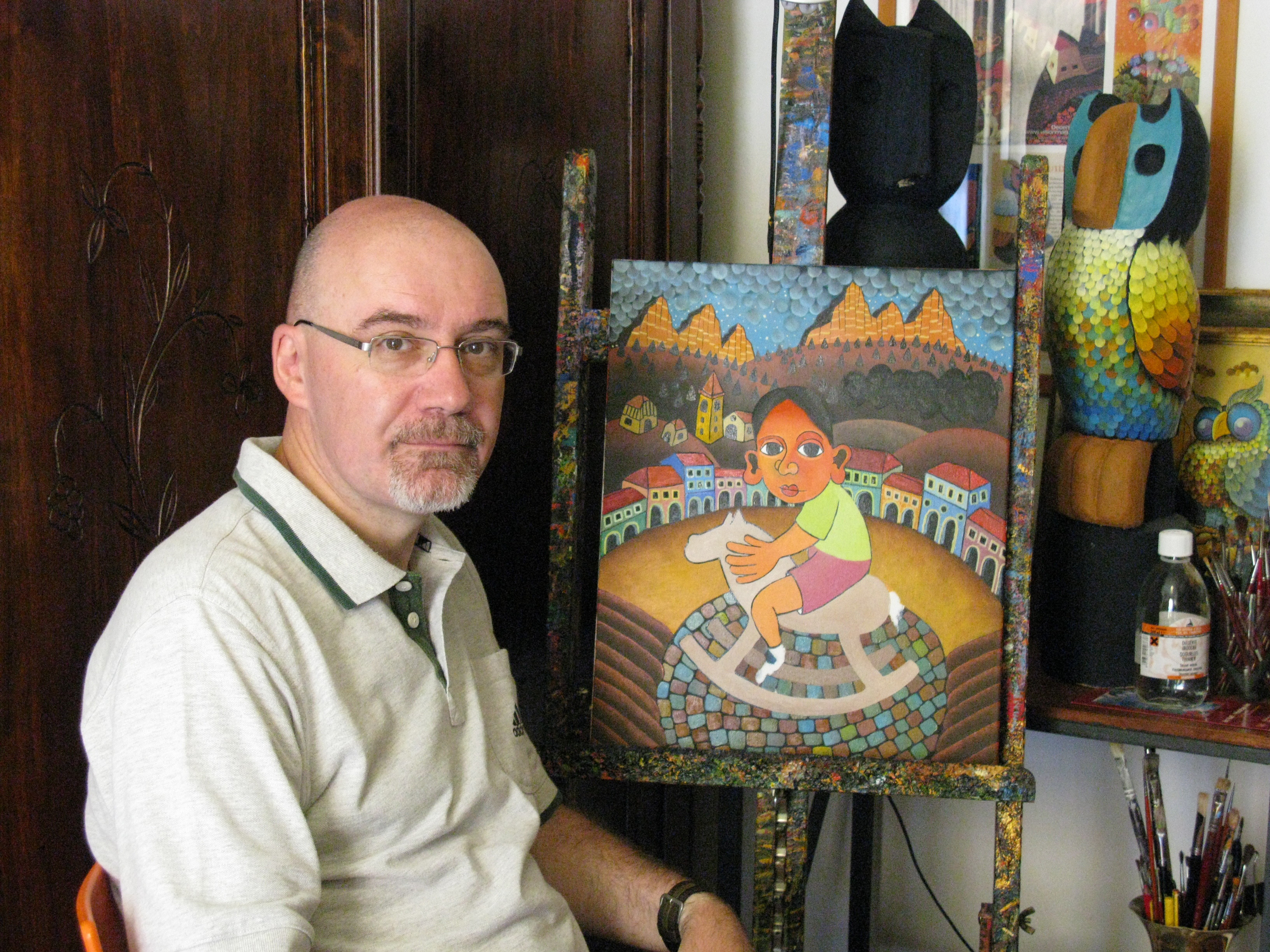
- Guido Vedovato in his studio
- Born: June 30, 1961 (age 64); Vicenza, Italy
- Known for: Painting, Sculpture,
- Movement: Naive art

Guido Vedovato (30 June 1961 in Vicenza, Italy) Italian naïve painter and sculptor.

Vedovato is one of the best-known Naïve artists. He was born in Vicenza, northern part of Italy. He lives and works in Camisano Vicentino. He graduated as an economist and had no artist scholar background. Yugoslavian Naïve art had a big effect on his works. It made him to start painting at the end of the 1970s. At the beginning it was one of his hobbies however later it became his passion.

He wants to depict short stories in his paintings. We may have a look at the life of the modern villages in the Italian chains of the Alps. Some of his well-known paints depicts animals in the night, but—as he said, he preferred to paint humans.

== Works in collections ==
- Museum of Naive Art - Jagodina (Serbia),
- Museo Nazionale della Arti Naives „Cesare Zavattini” – Luzzara (Italy),
- Musée International d’Art Naive – Bages (France),
- Slovenian Naive Art Museum - Trebnje (Slovenia),
- Museo Internacional de Arte Naif Manuel Moral – Jaén (Spain),
- MAN – Musée d’Art Naif - Béraut (France),
- Vihorlatské Osvetové Stredisko - Homonna (Slovakia),
- Musée d’Art Naive International Yvon M. Daigle, Quebec (Canada),
- MIDAN – Musée International d’Art Naive- Vicq (France),
- Museo Civico „Umberto Nobile” e d’Arte Naive – Lauro (Italy),
- Musée d'Art Spontané, Brussels (Belgium),
- Moscow State Museum of Naive Art – Moscow (Russia),
- Magyar Naiv Művészek Múzeuma - Kecskemét (Hungary),
- Gallery of Szombathely - Szombathely (Hungary),
- Evere Municipality Art Collection - Brussels (Belgium)
- Balaton Museum - Keszthely (Hungary).

== Exhibitions ==
- 2015 - Balaton Museum, Keszthely, Hungary (solo)
- 2014 - National Library of Foreign Literature, Budapest, Hungary (solo)
- 2013 - Gallery of Szombathely, Szombathely, Hungary (solo)
- 2013 - House of Civil Communities - Gebauer Gallery, Pécs, Hungary (solo)
- 2012 - Le Musée d'Art Spontané, Brussels, Belgium (solo)
- 2012 - 16th Colony of naive and marginal art, Museum of Naive Art, Jagodina, Serbia
- 2012 - Museum of Hungarian Naive Artists, Kecskemét, Hungary (solo)
- 2012 - Újpest Art Gallery, Budapest, Hungary (solo)
- 2008 - Institute of Italian Culture, Kneza Miloša, Serbia
- 2008 - Galeria Eboli, Madrid
- 2008 - The Four Seasons: The Naïve Art of Italy, GINA Gallery of International Naïve Art, Tel Aviv, Israel
- 2007 - Moscow State Museum of Naïve Art, Moscow, Russia
- 2007 - Rassegna Internazionale Naif Mandria, Chivasso, Italy
- 2007 - Michalovce, Slovak Republic (solo)
- 2007 - Bardejov, Slovak Republic (solo)
- 2007 - Piwnice Gallery, Przemyśl, Poland (solo)
- 2006 - Svidnik, Slovak Republic (solo)
- 2006 - Vihorlatske Muzeum, Humenne, Slovak Republic (solo)
- 2006 - International Meeting of Naïve Art, Verneuil su Avre, France
- 2006 - Premio Nazionale Naif Cesare Zavattini, Luzzara, Italy
- 2005 - International Meeting of Naïve Artists, Trebnje, Slovenia
- 2004 - Premio Nazionale Naif Cesare Zavattini, Luzzara, Italy
- 2003 - Premio Internazionale Naif Varenna, Varenna, Italy
- 2003 - Gaianigo Gallery, Sovizzo, Italy (solo)
- 2001 - Villa Thiene, Quinto Vicentino, Italy (solo)
- 2000 - Naïve Art Exhibition, Bagnolo San Vito, Italy (solo)
- 1995 - Naïve Art Exhibition, Bagnolo San Vito, Italy (solo)
- 1992 - Naïve Art Exhibition, Bagnolo San Vito, Italy (solo)

== See also ==
- Naive art
