= George Fredericks =

English painter (born 1929)

- Born: 1929
- Known for: Painting
- Notable work: Circus scene (1990)
- Movement: Naïve art

George Fredericks (born 1929) is an English naïve artist.

Fredericks has exhibited his paintings since 1957, and developed an early following by British and international artists, including Peter Blake and Larry Bell.

His paintings have been exhibited in many major European centres, including in galleries in Amsterdam, Hamburg, London (the Redfern, the Crane Art and Rona Galleries) and Zurich, and in museums in France.

== Works ==
His Bald Trainer and Animals (1974) is in the Bridgeman Art Library. His paintings Acrobat (no date) and Circus Scene (1990) are in the collections of the Milwaukee Art Museum.
