= Bracha Turner =

Bracha Turner (Hebrew: ברכה טורנר; 1925 – 2011) was a Naive Artist born in Jerusalem, eventually moving to Forest Hills, New York (where she would spend the remainder of her life). Turner began painting at the age of 58 and has had 56 solo exhibitions, including a solo exhibit in 1998 at The Bible Museum in Tel Aviv. Her works have appeared at numerous juried exhibitions, including the J. F. Kennedy Art Gallery in Montreal; New England Fine Arts Institute, Boston, MA; West Side Arts Coalition, NY; International Women in the Arts Conference, Beijing, China; Second International Women Artists’ Festival at the Ft. Mason Center in San Francisco, CA; La Galerie Internationale, Palo Alto, CA; Galerie Everats, Paris, France; World Contemporary Art ’98 Exhibition, Los Angeles, CA; Audubon Artists at the Salmagundi Club, New York City.

Bracha Turner's paintings are on permanent display at the Bible Museum, Tel Aviv, Israel; Hadassah Headquarters in New York City; ZOA House, Tel Aviv, Israel; The National Council of Jewish Women, N.Y. Section; NCJW, National Headquarters, New York City; The Office of the Mayor of Jerusalem, Israel; The Office of the Mayor of Safed, and in the Mayor's office in New York City. Her works are on display at the Yeshiva University Museum in New York City; Columbia University Hospital, NYC; Jacob Medical Hospital Chapels, Bronx, NY; Bikur Cholim Hospital, Jerusalem, Israel; Emunah of America, NYC; Ramaz School, NYC: Lubavitch Youth Organization, Brooklyn, NY; Habonim, NYC; Haaguda lema’an Hachayal BeIsrael, Tel Aviv; The Queens Borough President's office, NY; Hadassah Hospital Mother and Child Center, Jerusalem; Rambam Hospital, Haifa. Her works are also found in many private collections.

One of her paintings has been reproduced on card published by Hadassah, and six of her drawings appeared in the 1989 book Sara's Daughters Sing. She appeared in the Jewish Women's Literary Annual Book and in the Encyclopedia of International Women Artists.

Bracha Turner has given slide presentations of her works at 42 communities and institutions.

The artist is the granddaughter of Rabbi Shmuel Schulman, the self-taught artist in 19th century Eretz Israel, whose works are at the Israel Museum in Jerusalem and the Jewish Museum in Paris, France. Bracha Turner was born in the old Jewish quarter of Jerusalem and, like her grandfather, was self-taught. Her media include oil, pastel, and pen-and-ink.
