= Petah Tikva Museum of Art =

Art museum in Israel

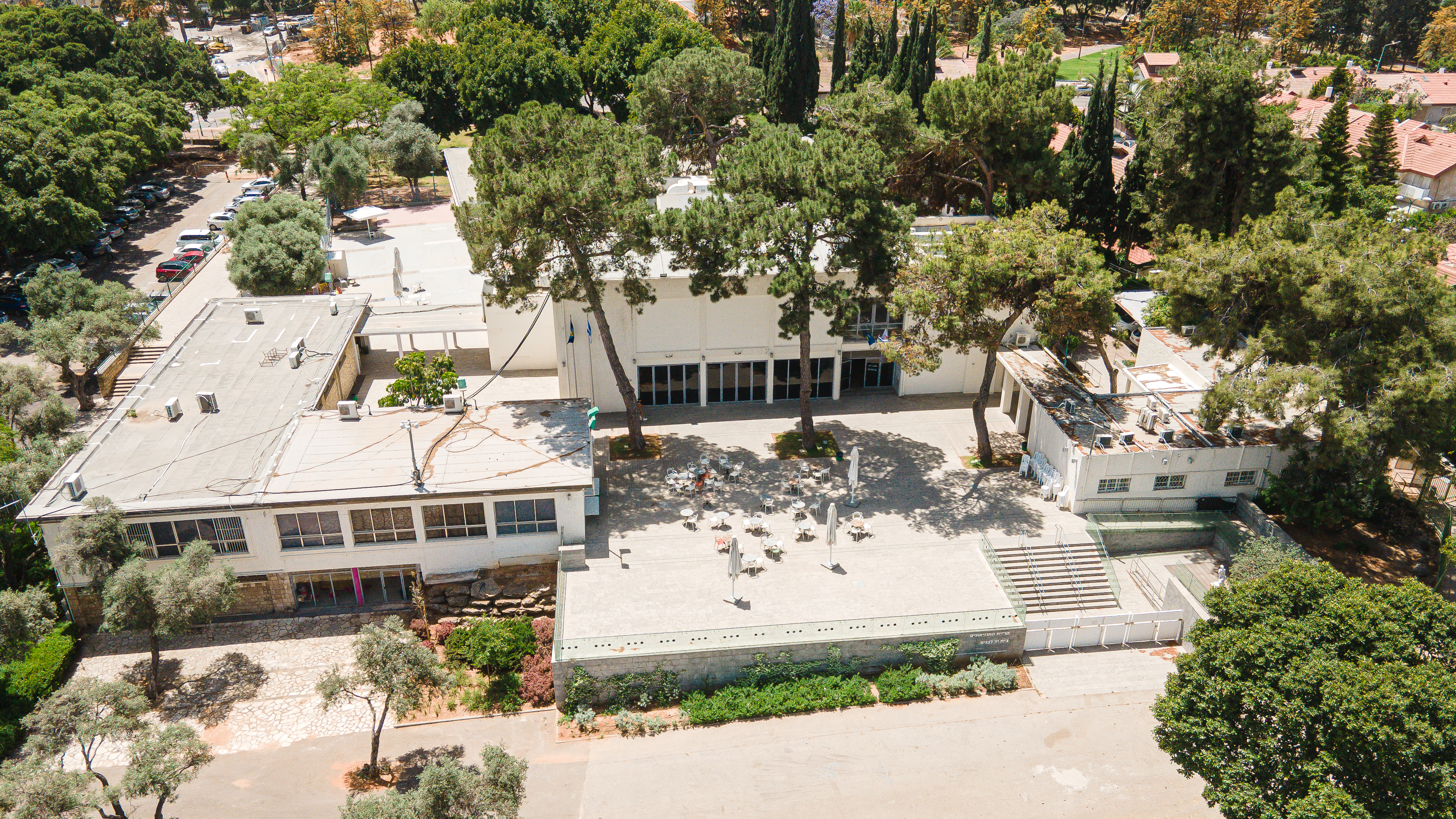
- Established: 1964
- Location: Arlozorov 30, Petah Tikva, Israel
- Coordinates: 32.085278°N 34.8725°E
- Type: Art
- Director: Reut Ferster
- Curator: Irena Gordon
- Website: petachtikvamuseum.com/hp

The Petah Tikva Museum of Art is an art museum in Arlozorov Street, Petah Tikva, Israel.

== History ==
The museum is part of Petah Tikva's Museum Complex. Most of the art at the museum (roughly 3188 items) is art in memory and perpetuation of others, and were collected by Yad Labanim. The building originally opened in 1952, and was the first of its kind in Israel, and the museum itself opened in 1964. Between 1987 and 1993, the museum's director was Dalia Levin. In 2004, the building was reopened after renovation of the building and cataloging the collection of artwork. At the time, Drorit Gur Arye had become the director of the museum. The museum is divided into a changing exhibition hall, and a smaller gallery, which presents an exhibition of the museum's collections. The museum offers free admittance on Saturdays.

== Museum structure ==
The museum building consists of a hall for temporary exhibitions, as well as a smaller gallery, which displays exhibits from the museum's art collection. The museum displays works by Israeli and international artists.

Alongside the museum and as part of the Petah Tikva Museum Complex, there is the "Yad Labanim" House, the historical museum of Petah Tikva's history, the historical archive, the Institute of Visual Arts; and an auditorium where activities are held, including lectures, artistic performances and film screenings.

== See also ==
- Israeli art
- List of museums in Israel
