= Henri Rousseau =

French painter (1844–1910)

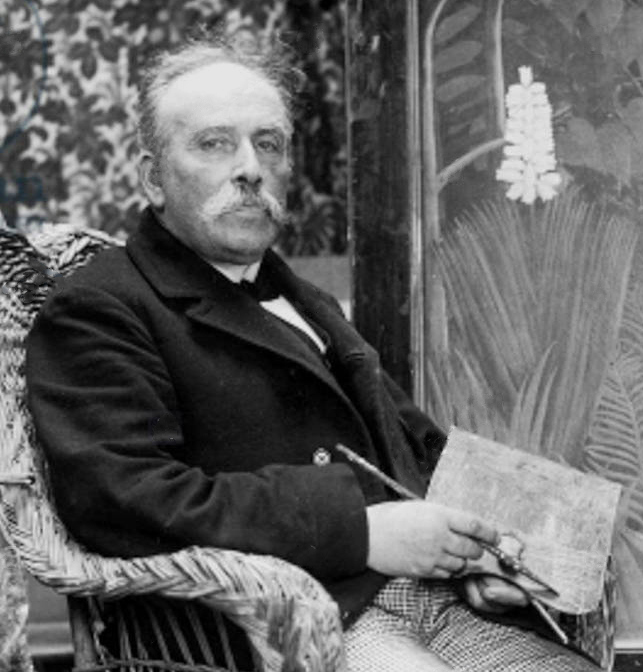
- Rousseau in 1907 by Dornac
- Born: Henri Julien Félix Rousseau; 21 May 1844; Laval, France
- Died: 2 September 1910 (aged 66); Paris, France
- Education: Self-taught
- Known for: Painting
- Notable work: The Sleeping Gypsy, Tiger in a Tropical Storm, The Hungry Lion Throws Itself on the Antelope, Boy on the Rocks
- Movement: Post-Impressionism, Naïve art, Primitivism

Signature
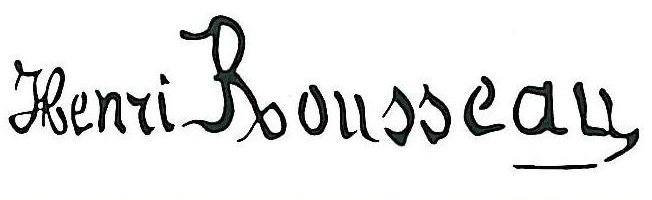

Henri Julien Félix Rousseau (French: [ɑ̃ʁi ʒyljɛ̃ feliks ʁuso]; 21 May 1844 – 2 September 1910) was a French post-Impressionist painter in the Naïve or Primitive manner. He was also known as Le Douanier (the customs officer), a humorous description of his occupation as a toll and tax collector. He started painting seriously in his early forties; by age 49, he retired from his job to work on his art full-time.

Ridiculed during his lifetime by critics, he came to be recognised as a self-taught genius whose works are of high artistic quality. Rousseau's work exerted an extensive influence on several generations of avant-garde artists.

== Career ==
=== Early life ===
Rousseau was born in Laval, Mayenne, France, in 1844 into the family of a tinsmith; he was forced to work there as a young child. He attended Laval High School as a day student, and then as a boarder after his father became a debtor and his parents had to leave the town upon the seizure of their house. Though mediocre in some of his high school subjects, Rousseau won prizes for drawing and music.

After high school, he worked for a lawyer and studied law, but "attempted a small perjury and sought refuge in the army." He served four years, starting in 1863. With his father's death, Rousseau moved to Paris in 1868 to support his widowed mother as a government employee. In 1868, he married Clémence Boitard, with whom he had six children. In 1871, he was appointed as a collector of the octroi of Paris, collecting taxes on goods entering Paris. Following Boitard's death in 1888, he married his second wife, Josephine Noury, in 1899.

=== Career ===
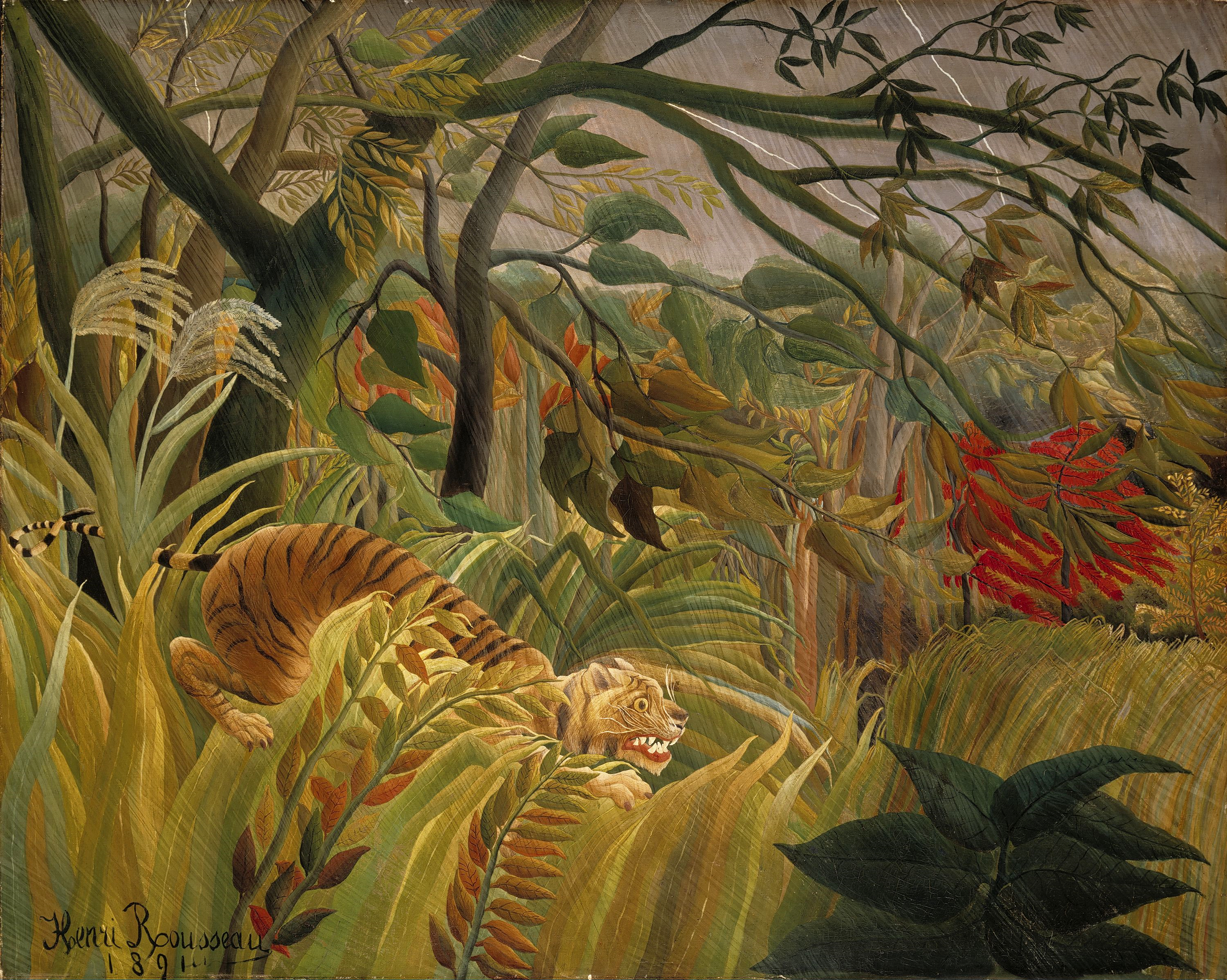
Tiger in a Tropical Storm (Surprised!) (1891) was the first of many jungle scenes for which Rousseau is best known.

Rousseau did not travel and most of the jungles he painted were on display in the Natural History Museum and the botanical garden in Paris. From 1886, he exhibited regularly in the Salon des indépendants. Although his work was not placed prominently, it drew an increasing following over the years. Tiger in a Tropical Storm (Surprised!) was exhibited in 1891, and Rousseau received his first serious review when the young artist Félix Vallotton wrote: "His tiger surprising its prey ought not to be missed; it's the alpha and omega of painting." Yet it was more than a decade before Rousseau returned to depicting his vision of jungles.

In 1893, Rousseau moved to a studio in Montparnasse where he lived and worked until his death in 1910. In 1897, he produced one of his most famous paintings, The Sleeping Gypsy, which is now on display in the Barnes Foundation.

In 1905, Rousseau's large jungle scene The Hungry Lion Throws Itself on the Antelope was exhibited at the Salon des indépendants near works by younger leading avant-garde artists such as Henri Matisse, in what is now seen as the first showing of The Fauves. Rousseau's painting may even have influenced the naming of the Fauves. In 1907, he was commissioned by artist Robert Delaunay's mother, Berthe, Comtesse de Delaunay, to paint The Snake Charmer.

=== Le Banquet Rousseau ===
When Pablo Picasso happened upon a painting by Rousseau being sold on the street as a canvas to be painted over, the younger artist instantly recognised Rousseau's genius and went to meet him. In 1908, Picasso held a half serious, half burlesque banquet in his studio at Le Bateau-Lavoir in Rousseau's honour. Guests at the banquet Rousseau included: Guillaume Apollinaire, Jean Metzinger, Juan Gris, Max Jacob, Marie Laurencin, André Salmon, Maurice Raynal, Daniel-Henri Kahnweiler, Leo Stein, and Gertrude Stein. Le Banquet Rousseau, "one of the most notable social events of the twentieth century," wrote US poet and literary critic John Malcolm Brinnin, "was neither an orgiastic occasion nor even an opulent one. Its subsequent fame grew from the fact that it was a colourful happening within a revolutionary art movement at a point of that movement's earliest success, and from the fact that it was attended by individuals whose separate influences radiated like spokes of creative light across the art world for generations."

Maurice Raynal, in Les Soirées de Paris, 15 January 1914, p.69, wrote about "Le Banquet Rousseau". Years later the French writer André Salmon recalled the setting of the illustrious banquet:

Here the nights of the Blue Period passed... here the days of the Rose Period flowered... here the Demoiselles d'Avignon halted in their dance to re-group themselves in accordance with the golden number and the secret of the fourth dimension... here fraternised the poets elevated by serious criticism into the School of the Rue Ravignan... here in these shadowy corridors lived the true worshippers of fire ... here one evening in the year 1908 unrolled the pageantry of the first and last banquet offered by his admirers to the painter Henri Rousseau called the Douanier.

=== Retirement and death ===
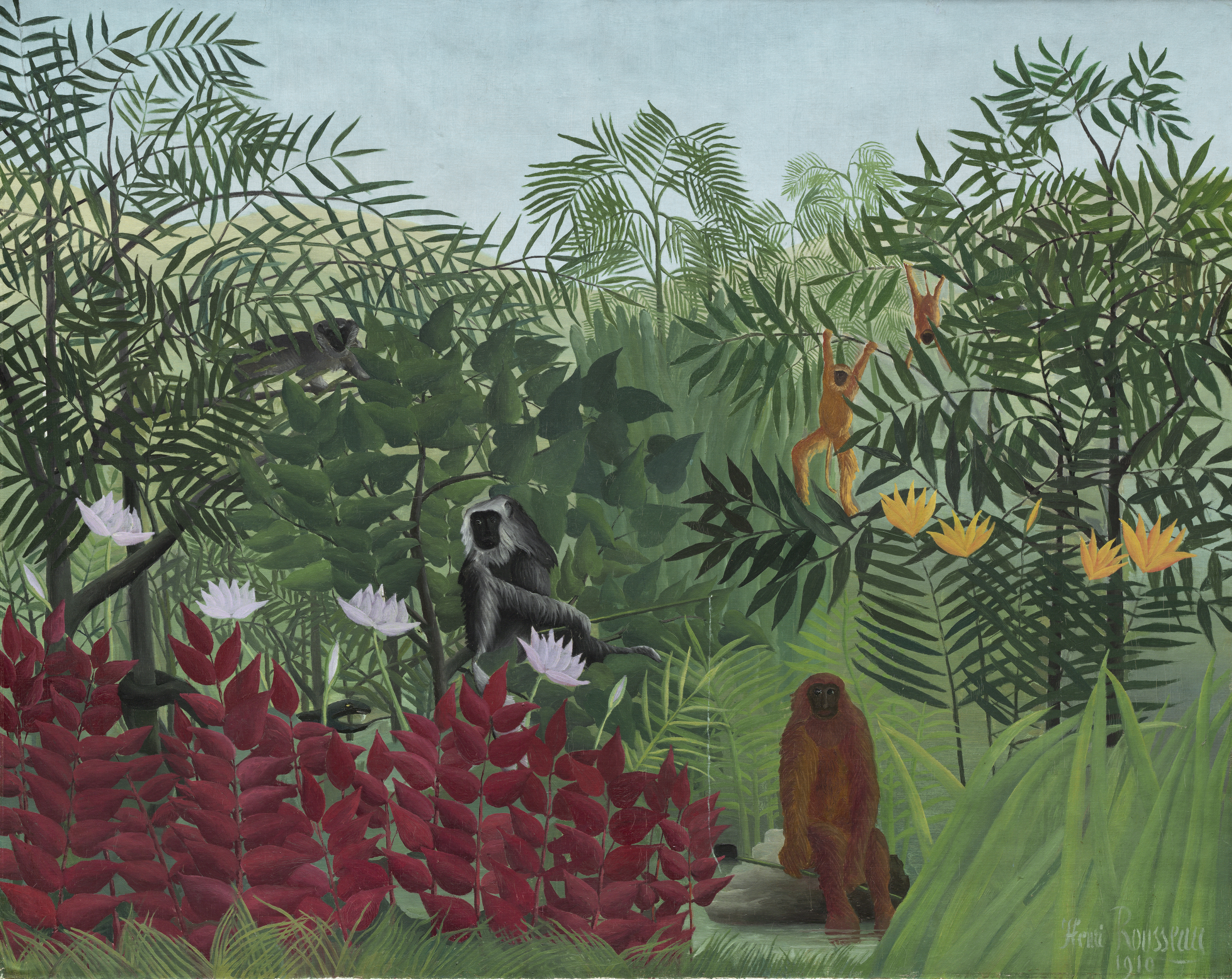
Tropical Forest with Monkeys (1910)

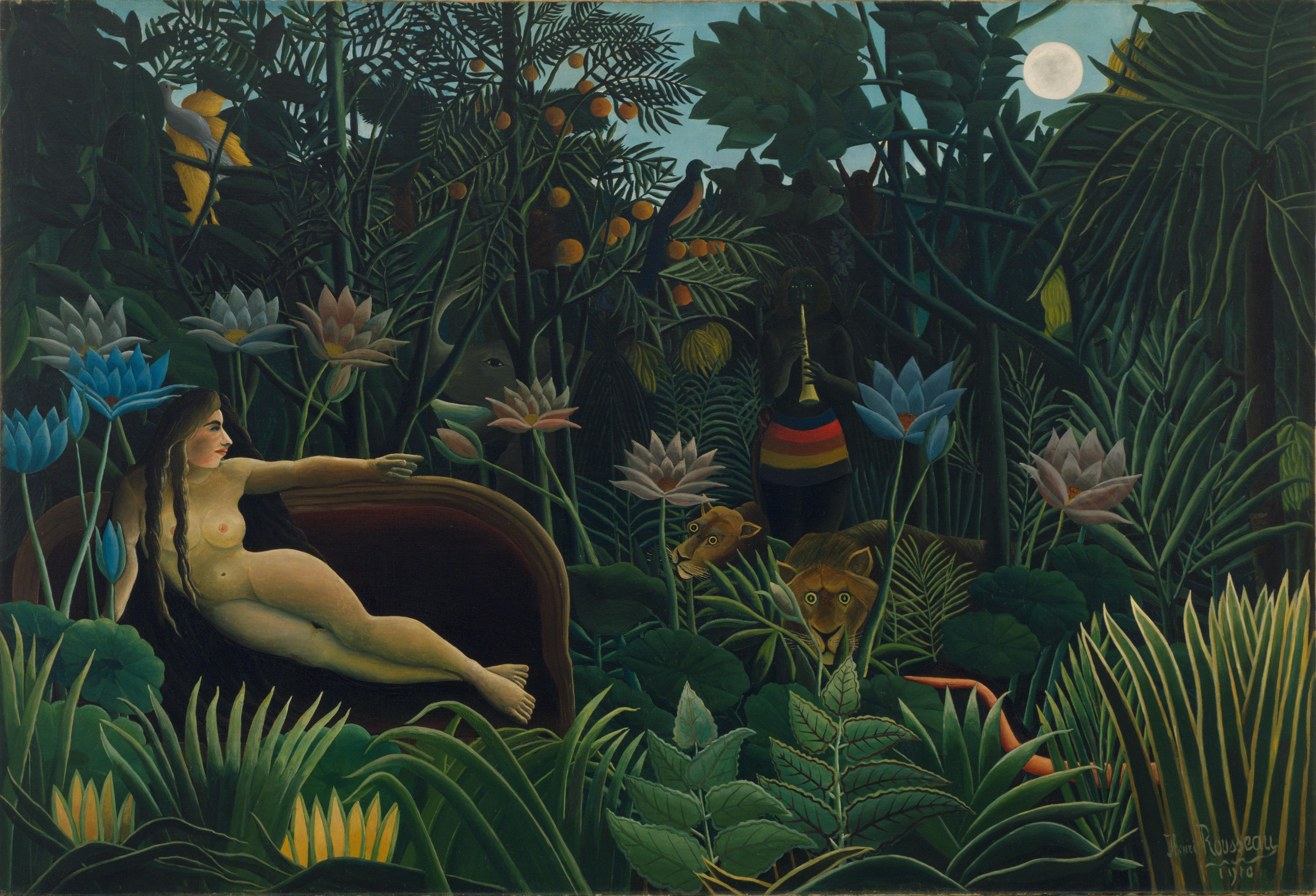
The Dream (1910) Museum of Modern Art

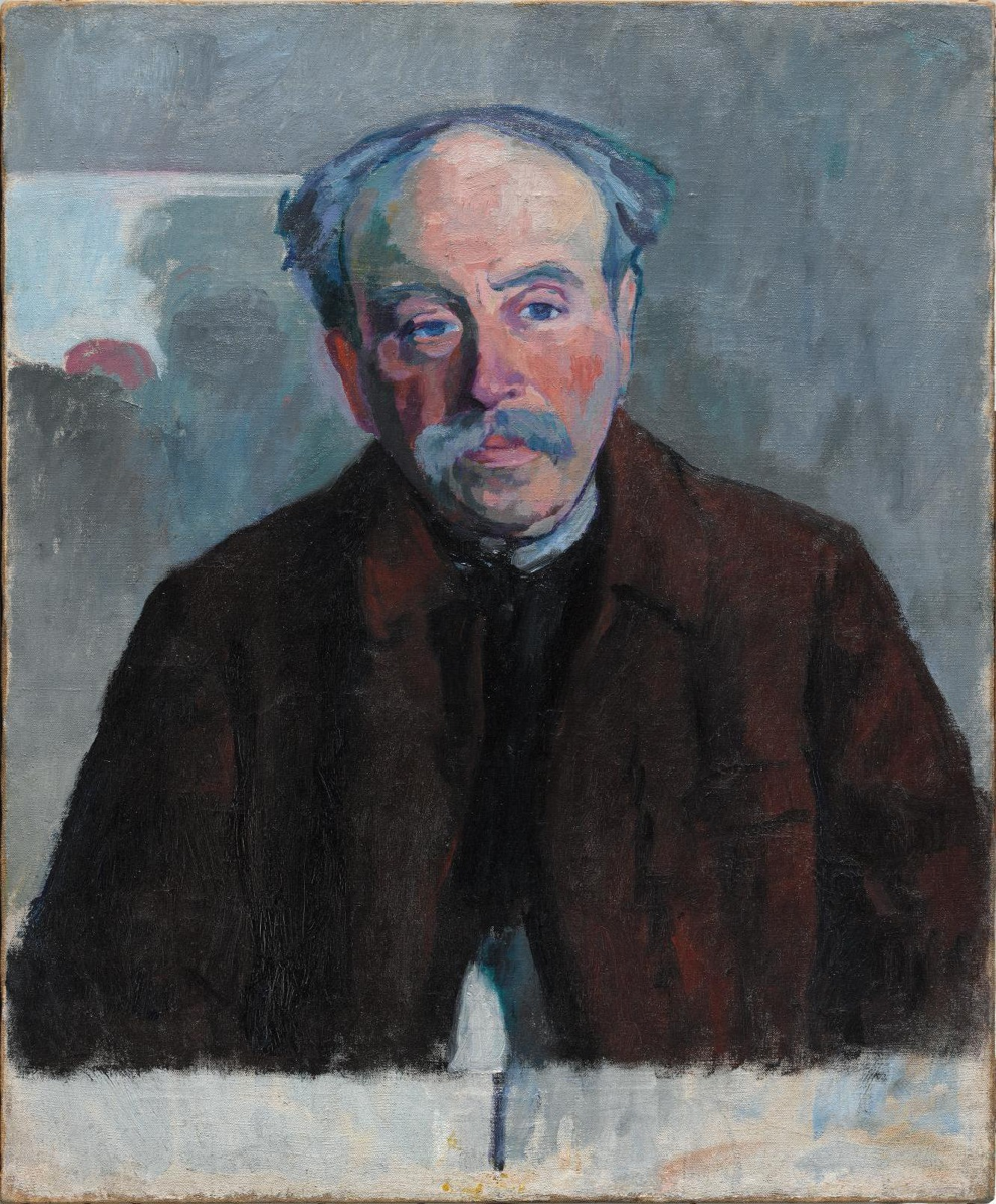
Portrait of Henri Rousseau by Robert Delaunay (1914), Musée National d'Art Moderne

After Rousseau's retirement in 1893, he supplemented his small pension with part-time jobs. He also worked briefly at Le Petit Journal, where he produced a number of its covers.

An equally famous work by Rousseau, included in the collection of John Hay Whitney, is Tropical Forest with Monkeys, which was painted during the last months of his life. It shows one of his signature exotic landscapes, lush, tropical, and virgin. Many of the animals in Rousseau's images have human faces or attributes. The central monkeys in this painting hold green sticks from which strings appear to dangle, suggesting fishing poles and human leisure activities, thereby emphasising the quasi-human experience of the animals. In this sense Rousseau's anthropomorphised primates can be seen not as true wild beasts, but rather as representing an escape from the "jungle" of Paris and the everyday grind of civilised life.

Rousseau exhibited his final painting, The Dream, in March 1910, at the Salon des Independants.

In the same month Rousseau suffered a phlegmon in his leg. In August, when he was admitted to the Necker Hospital in Paris where his son had died, he was found to have gangrene in his leg. After an operation, he died from a blood clot on 2 September 1910.

At his funeral, seven friends stood at his grave: the painters Paul Signac and Manuel Ortíz de Zárate; the artist couple Robert and Sonia Delaunay; the sculptor Constantin Brâncuși; Rousseau's landlord Armand Queval, and Guillaume Apollinaire, who wrote the epitaph Brâncuși put on the tombstone:

We salute you Gentle Rousseau you can hear us.
Delaunay, his wife, Monsieur Queval and myself.
Let our luggage pass duty free through the gates of heaven.
We will bring you brushes, paints and canvas.
That you may spend your sacred leisure in the
light and Truth of Painting.
As you once did my portrait facing the stars, lion and the gypsy.

== Artistry ==
=== Paintings ===
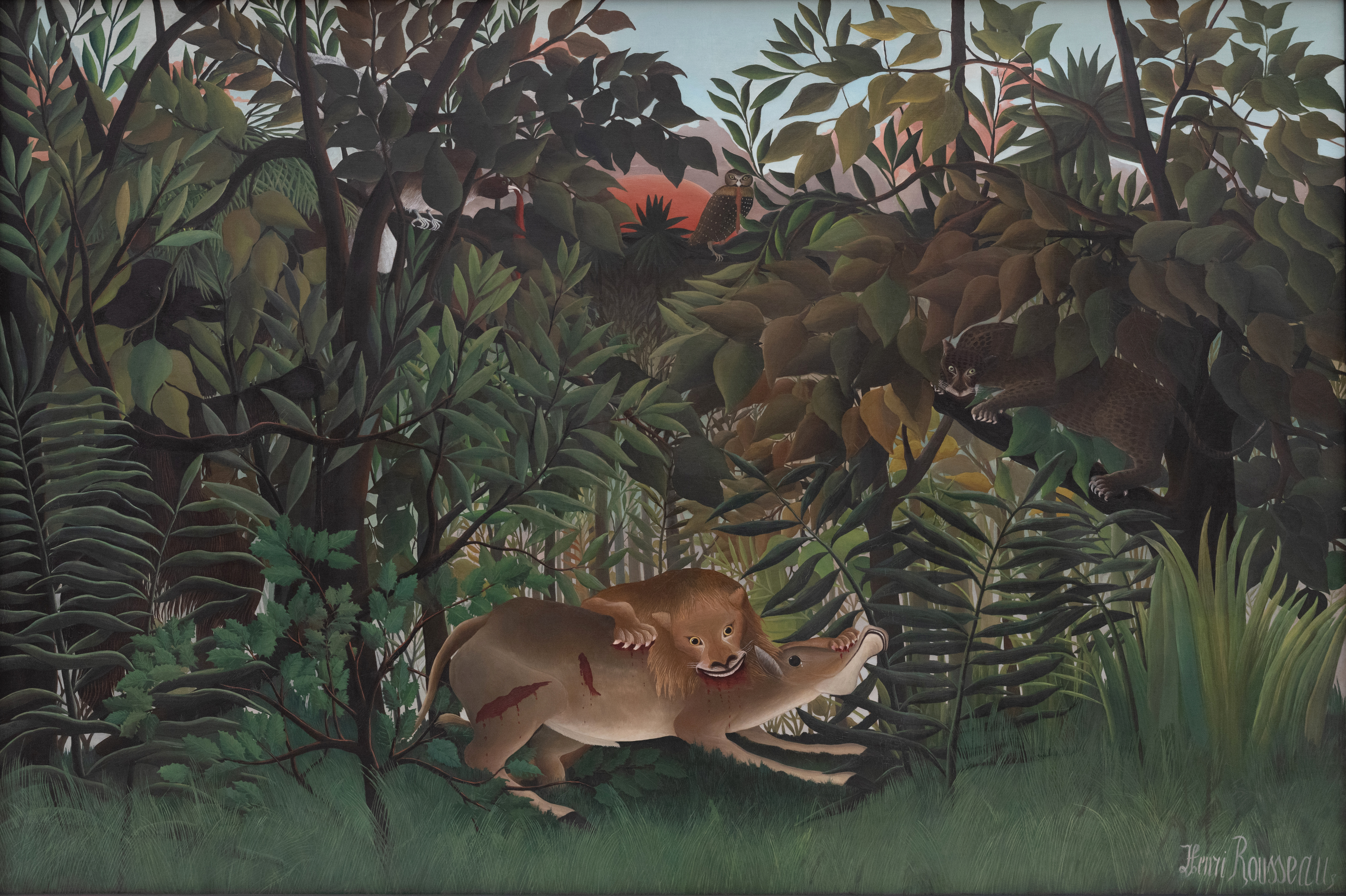
The Hungry Lion Throws Itself on the Antelope (1905)

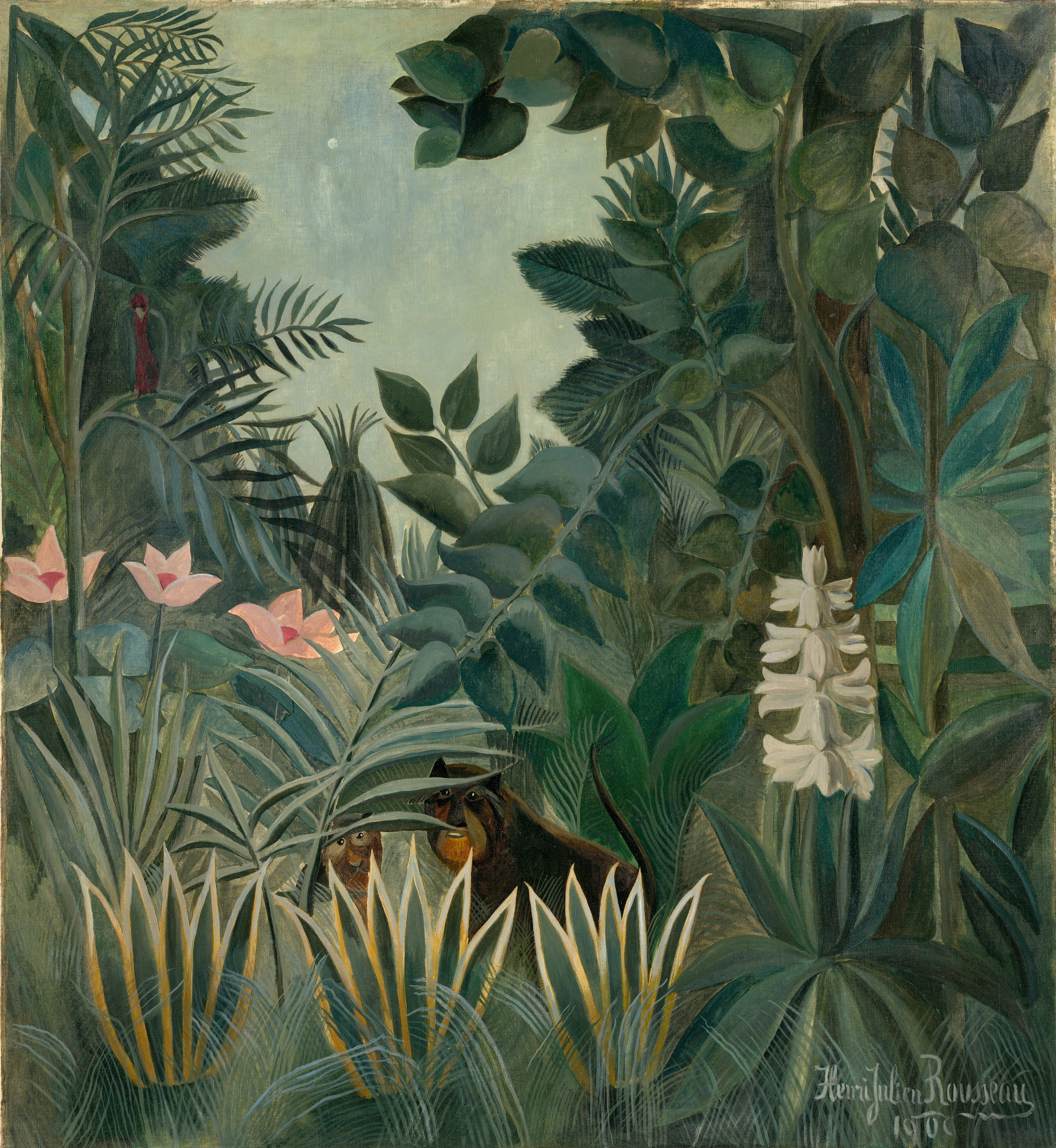
The Equatorial Jungle (1909), National Gallery of Art Washington

Rousseau had no academic training in any art. His paintings were at first ridiculed, but his naive primitive style influenced other contemporary artists. Aged 49, he applied for early retirement and devoted himself full-time to his painting portfolio. He only received a modest pension and supplemented his income by tutoring children in art. Contemporary academic artists include Claude Monet, Camille Pissarro, and Pierre-Auguste Renoir. Nevertheless, Rousseau is today regarded as a French post-impressionist painter. Rousseau claimed he had "no teacher other than nature", although he admitted he had received "some advice" from two established Academic painters, Félix Auguste Clément, and Jean-Léon Gérôme.

His best-known paintings depict jungle scenes, even though he never left France or saw a jungle. Stories spread by admirers that his army service included the French intervention in Mexico are unfounded. His inspiration came from illustrations in children's books and the botanical gardens in Paris, as well as tableaux of taxidermy wild animals. During his term of service, he had also met soldiers who had survived the French expedition to Mexico, and he listened to their stories of the subtropical country they had encountered. To the critic Arsène Alexandre, he described his frequent visits to the Jardin des Plantes: "When I go into the glass houses and I see the strange plants of exotic lands, it seems to me that I enter into a dream."

Along with his exotic scenes there was a concurrent output of smaller topographical images of the city and its suburbs.

He claimed to have invented a new genre of portrait landscape, which he achieved by starting a painting with a specific view, such as a favourite part of the city, and then depicting a person in the foreground, most notably his early Myself, Portrait-Landscape (1890).

=== Criticism and recognition ===
Rousseau's flat, seemingly childish style was disparaged by many critics; people often were shocked by his work or ridiculed it. His ingenuousness was extreme, and he always aspired, in vain, to conventional acceptance. Many observers commented that he painted like a child, but the work shows sophistication with his particular technique.

== Legacy ==
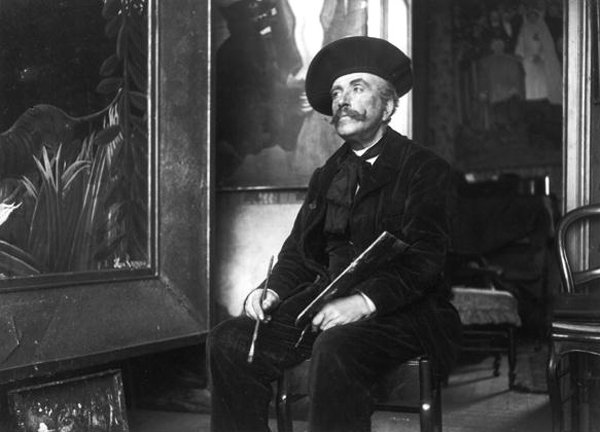
Rousseau in 1907

Rousseau's work exerted an extensive influence on several generations of avant-garde artists, including Pablo Picasso, Jean Hugo, Fernand Léger, Jean Metzinger, Max Beckmann, and the Surrealists. According to Roberta Smith, an art critic writing in The New York Times, "Beckmann's amazing self-portraits, for example, descend from the brusque, concentrated forms of Rousseau's portrait of the writer Pierre Loti."

In 1911, a retrospective exhibition of Rousseau's works was shown at the Salon des Indépendants. His paintings were also shown at the first exhibition of Der Blaue Reiter. Rousseau's art was exhibited as naïve art in salons and commercial art galleries alongside art by artists Rousseau did not personally know. Rousseau was posthumously promoted by the art dealer Wilhelm Uhde and a collection of naïve art is today curated by the Musée Maillol.

Critics have noted the influence of Rousseau on Wallace Stevens's poetry. See, for instance, Stevens's "Floral Decorations for Bananas" in the collection Harmonium. The US poet Sylvia Plath was a great admirer of Rousseau, referencing his art, as well as drawing inspiration from his works in her poetry. The poem, "Yadwigha, on a Red Couch, Among Lilies" (1958), is based upon his painting, The Dream, whilst the poem "Snakecharmer" (1957) is based upon his painting The Snake Charmer.

The song "The Jungle Line", by Joni Mitchell, is based upon a Rousseau painting.

Underground comic artist Bill Griffith drew a four-page biographical sketch of Rousseau, A Couch in the Sun, which was included in issue #2 of the Arcade anthology. The visual style of Michel Ocelot's 1998 animation film, Kirikou and the Sorceress, is partly inspired by Rousseau, particularly the depiction of the jungle vegetation. A Rousseau painting was used as an inspiration for the 2005 animated film Madagascar.

Rousseau's 1908 painting Fight Between a Tiger and a Buffalo was used as the inspiration for a series of 2021 advertisements concerning the rebrand of Facebook into the metaverse company Meta.

== Exhibitions ==
Two major museum exhibitions of his work were held in 1984-1985 (Grand Palais and Museum of Modern Art) and in 2001 (Kunsthalle Tubingen). "These efforts countered the persona of the humble, oblivious naïf by detailing his assured single-mindedness and tracked the extensive influence his work exerted on several generations of vanguard artists," critic Roberta Smith wrote in a review of a later exhibition.

A major exhibition of his work, "Henri Rousseau: Jungles in Paris", was shown at the Tate Modern (3 November 2005 – 5 February 2006), organised by the Tate and the Musée d'Orsay, where the show also appeared. The exhibition, encompassing 48 of his paintings, was on display at the National Gallery of Art Washington (16 July – 15 October 2006), and at the Grand Palais (15 March – 19 June 2006).

In 2015 the Fondazione Musei Civici di Venezia, the Musée d'Orsay, and the Musée de l'Orangerie collaborated on an exhibition Henri Rousseau that focused Rousseau's vision and his impact on his fellow artists. In addition to works by Rousseau, the exhibit featured works by fellow artists Georges Seurat, Wassily Kandinsky, Pablo Picasso among others. The exhibit was curated by Gabriella Belli, Guy Cogeval, Beatrice Avanzi, and Claire Bernardi. It was exhibited at the Doge's Palace (6 March – 6 September 2015), the Musée d'Orsay (titled The Douanier Rousseau. Archaic Candour, 22 March – 17 July 2016) and National Gallery Prague (16 September 2016 – 15 January 2017). (Note: The catalogue was written by Gabriella Belli and Guy Cogeval (ISBN 978-8-866-48256-7).)

The Barnes Foundation and the Musée de l'Orangerie organised Henri Rousseau: A Painter's Secrets, featuring nearly 60 of Rousseaus works. The exhibit was shown at the Barnes Foundation (19 October 2025 – 22 February 2026), and the Musée de l'Orangerie (25 March – 20 July 2026). (Note: The catalogue was edited by Christopher Green and Nancy Ireson (ISBN 978-0-300-28435-5).)

== Gallery ==
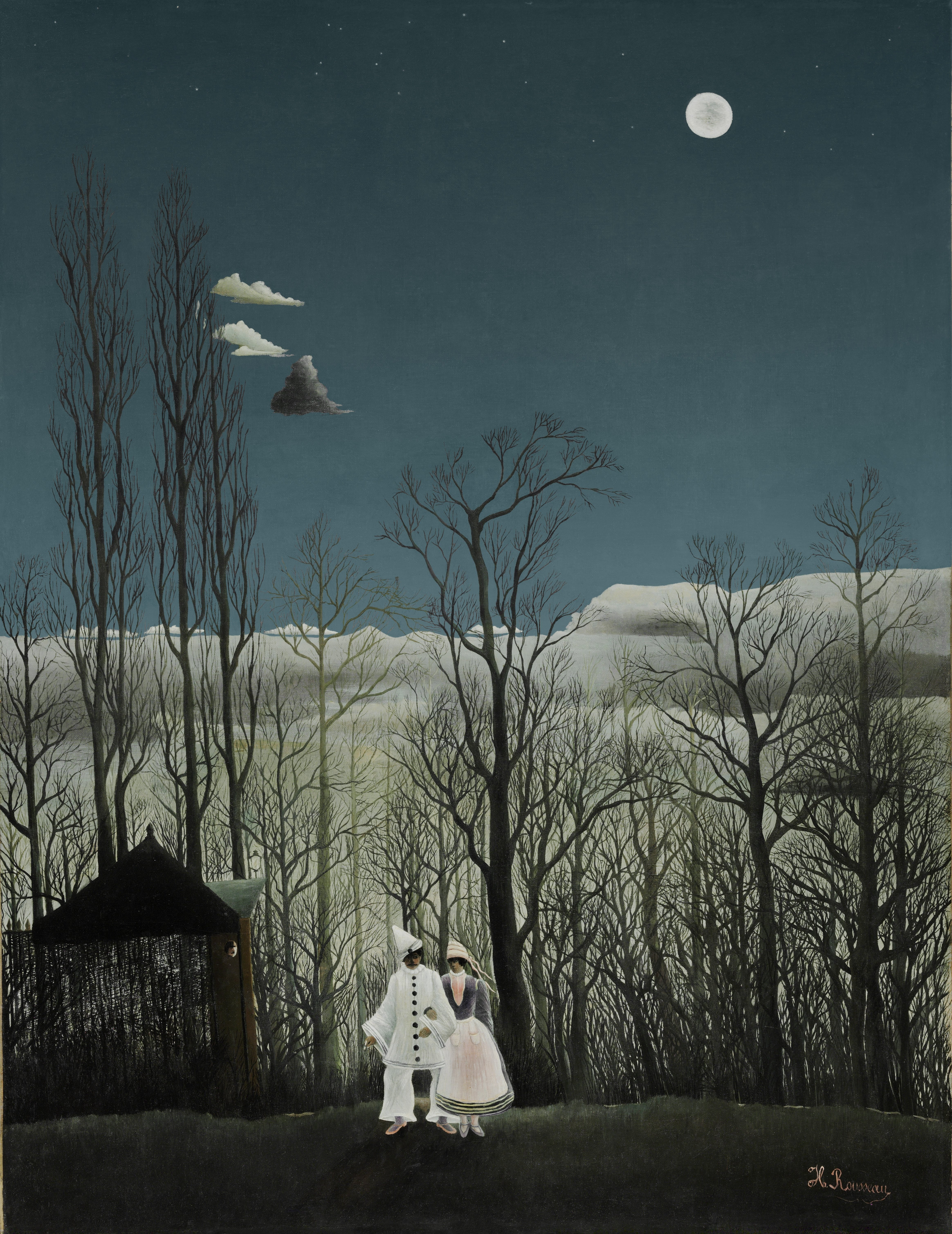
A Carnival Evening, 1886, Philadelphia Museum of Art

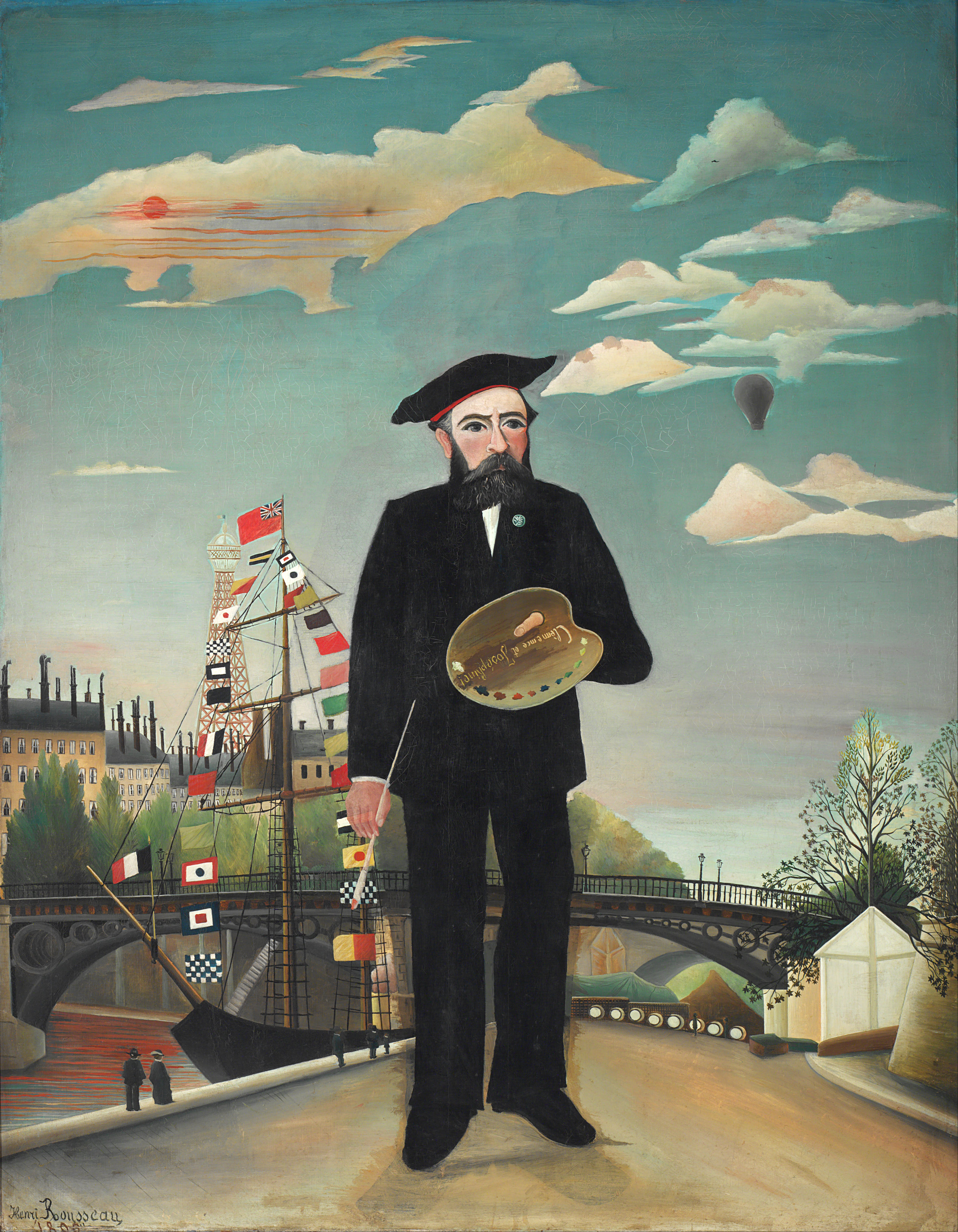
Self Portrait, 1890, National Gallery Prague

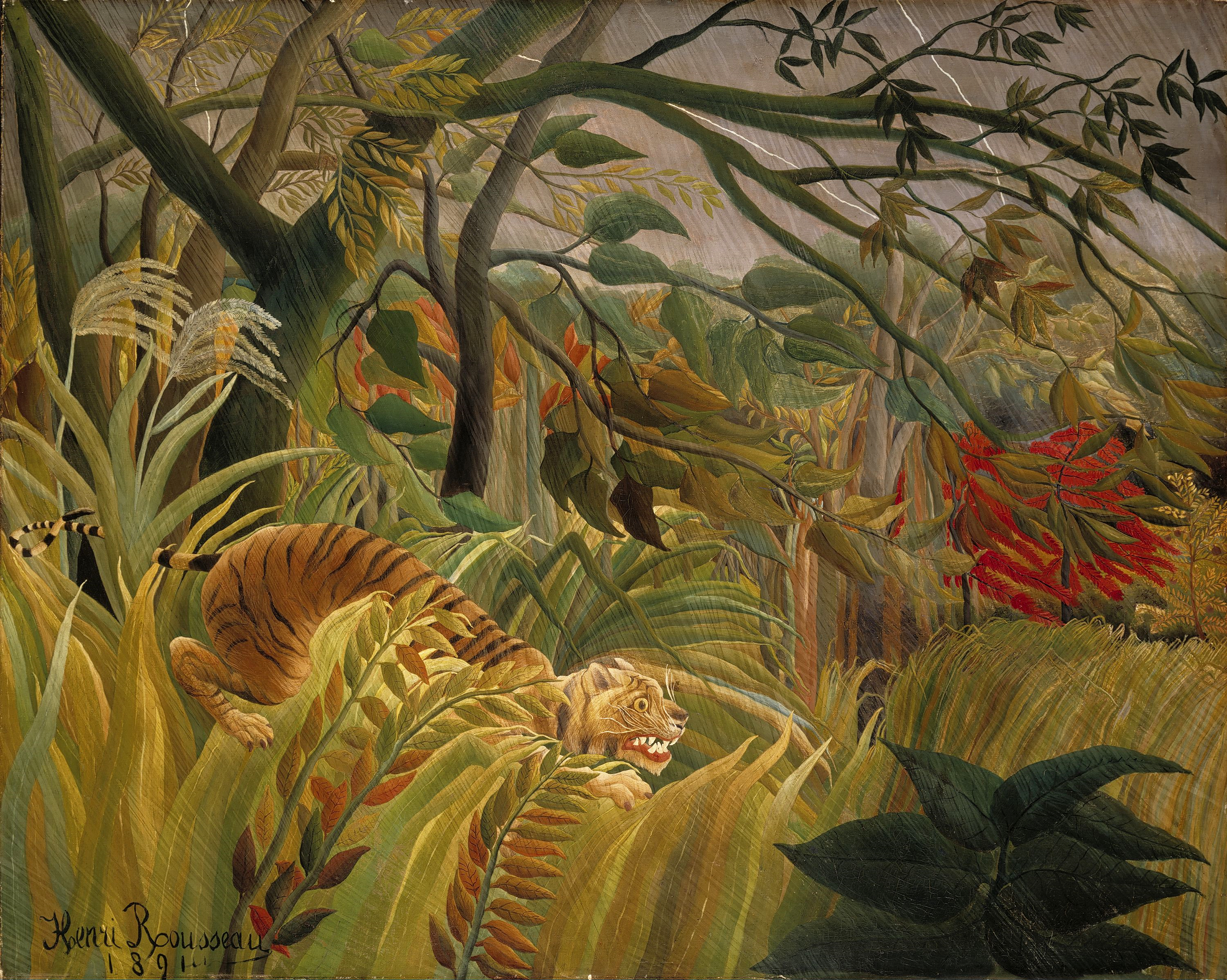
Tiger in a Tropical Storm, 1891, National Gallery London

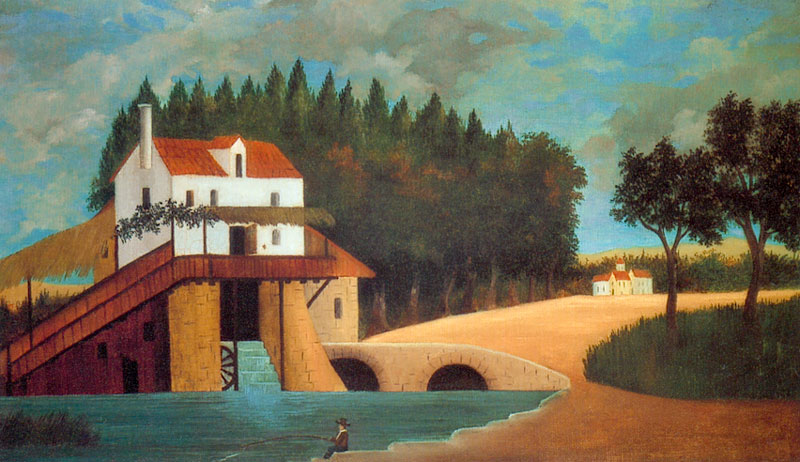
The Mill, c. 1896, Musée Maillol

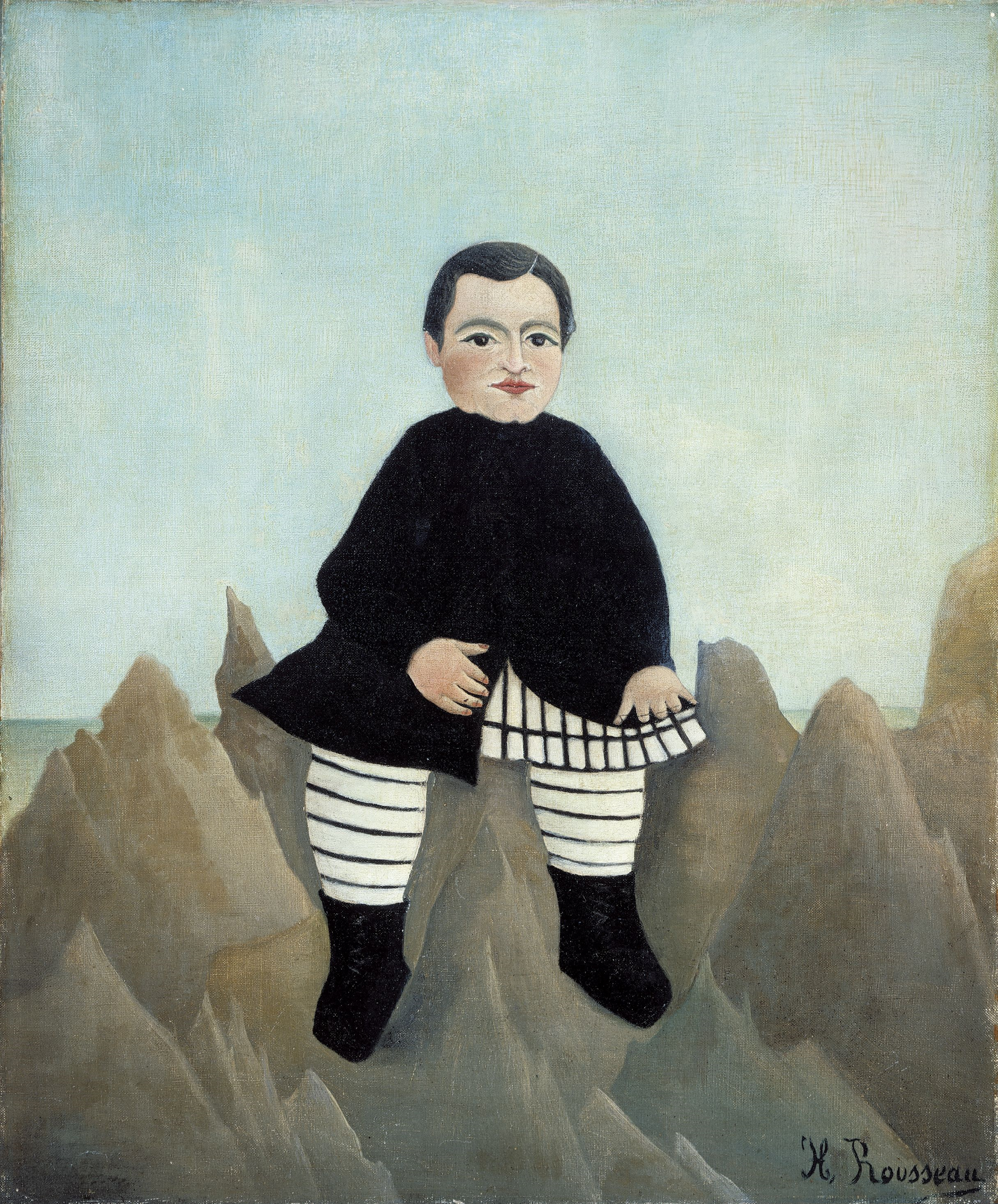
Boy on the Rocks, 1895–1897, National Gallery of Art Washington

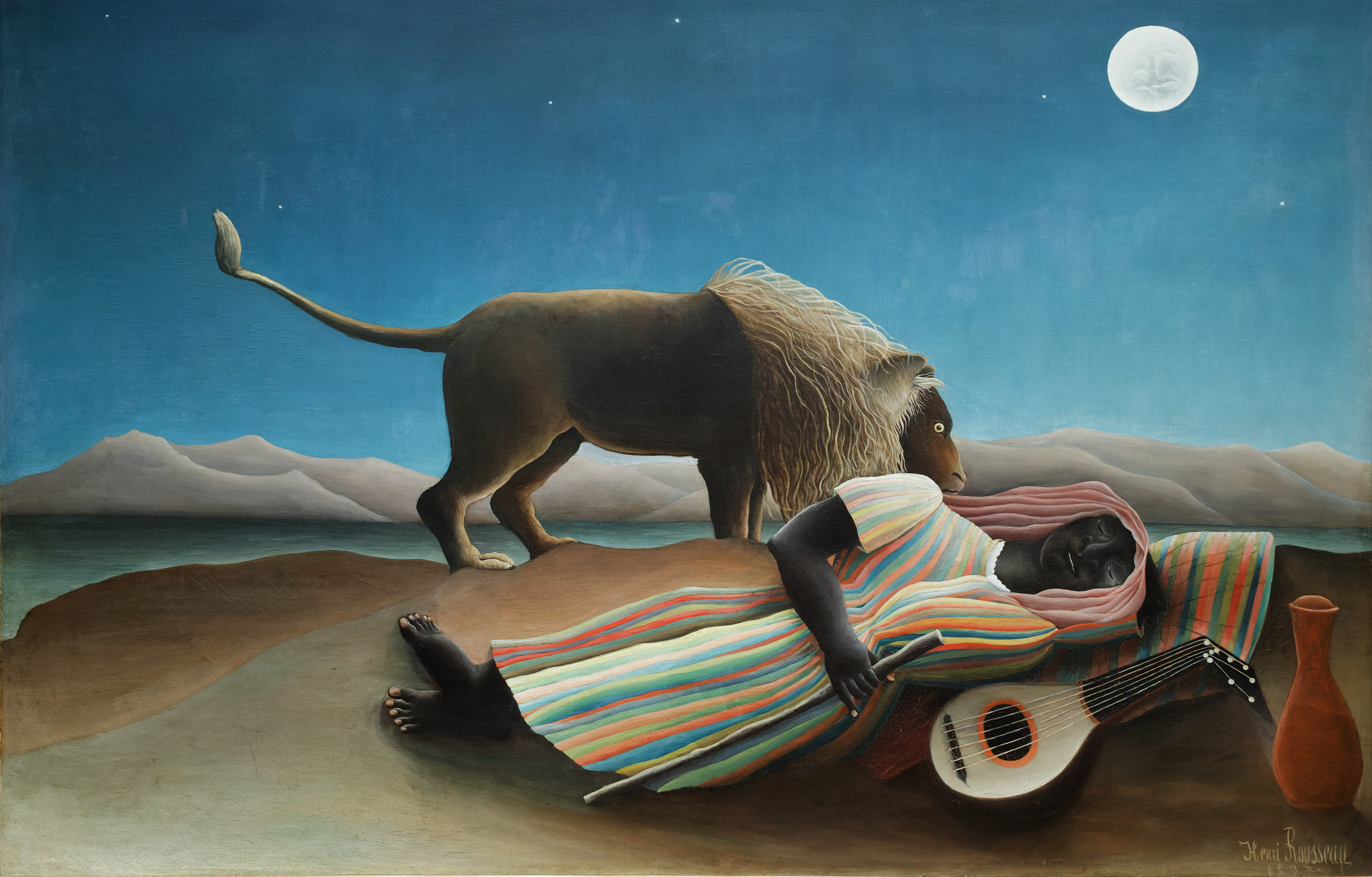
The Sleeping Gypsy, 1897, Museum of Modern Art

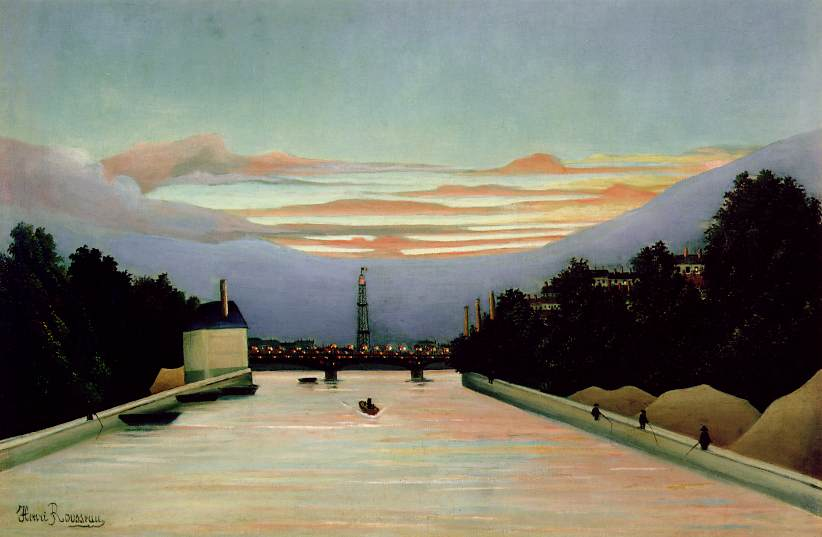
La tour Eiffel peinte par Henri Rousseau, 1898, Houston Museum of Fine Arts

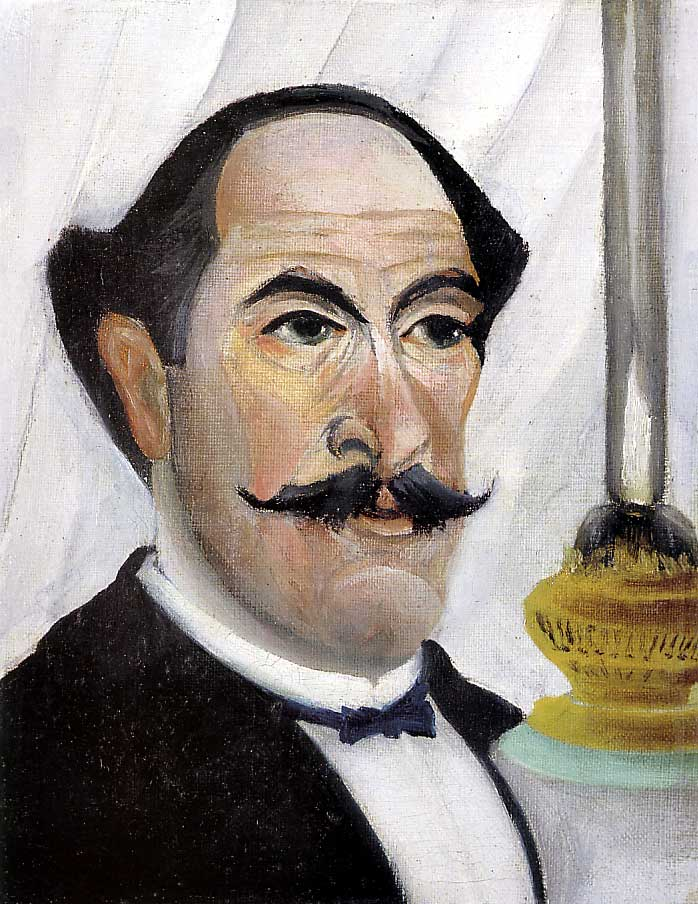
Self-portrait of the Artist with a Lamp, 1903

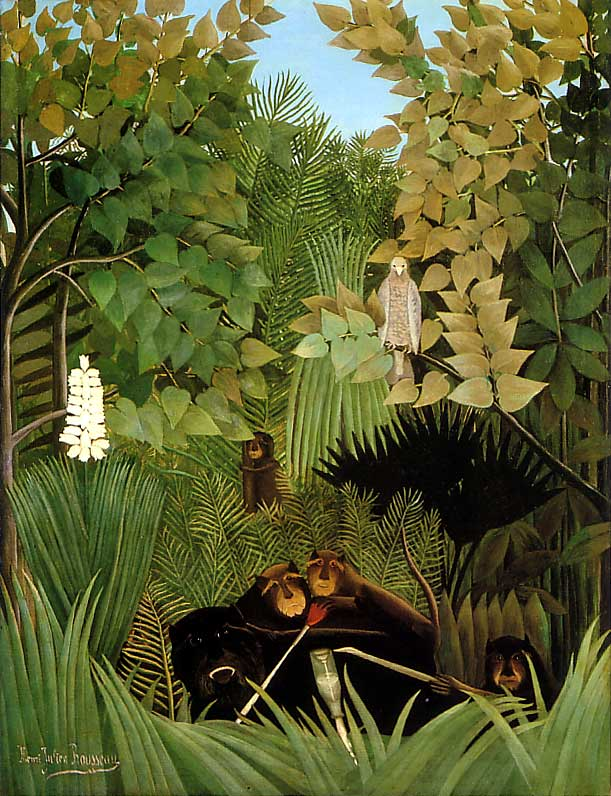
The Merry Jesters, 1906, Philadelphia Museum of Art

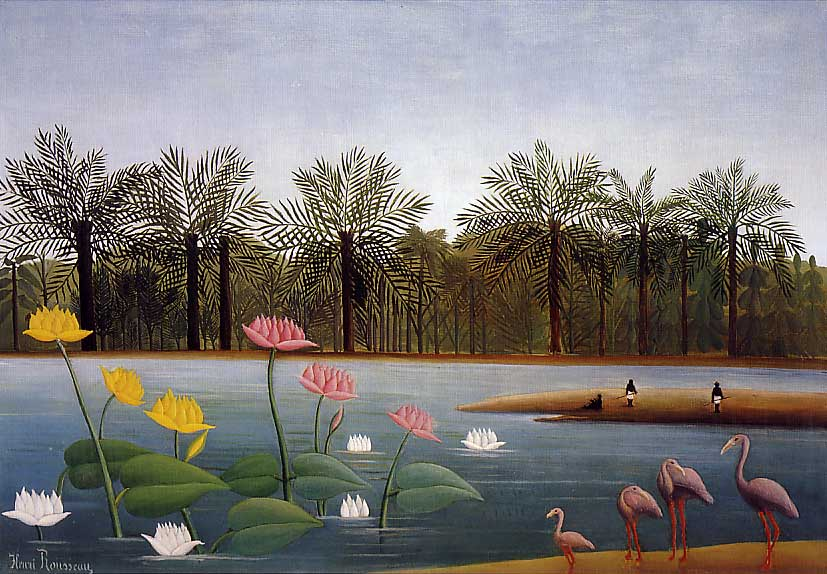
The Flamingoes, 1907, Private collection

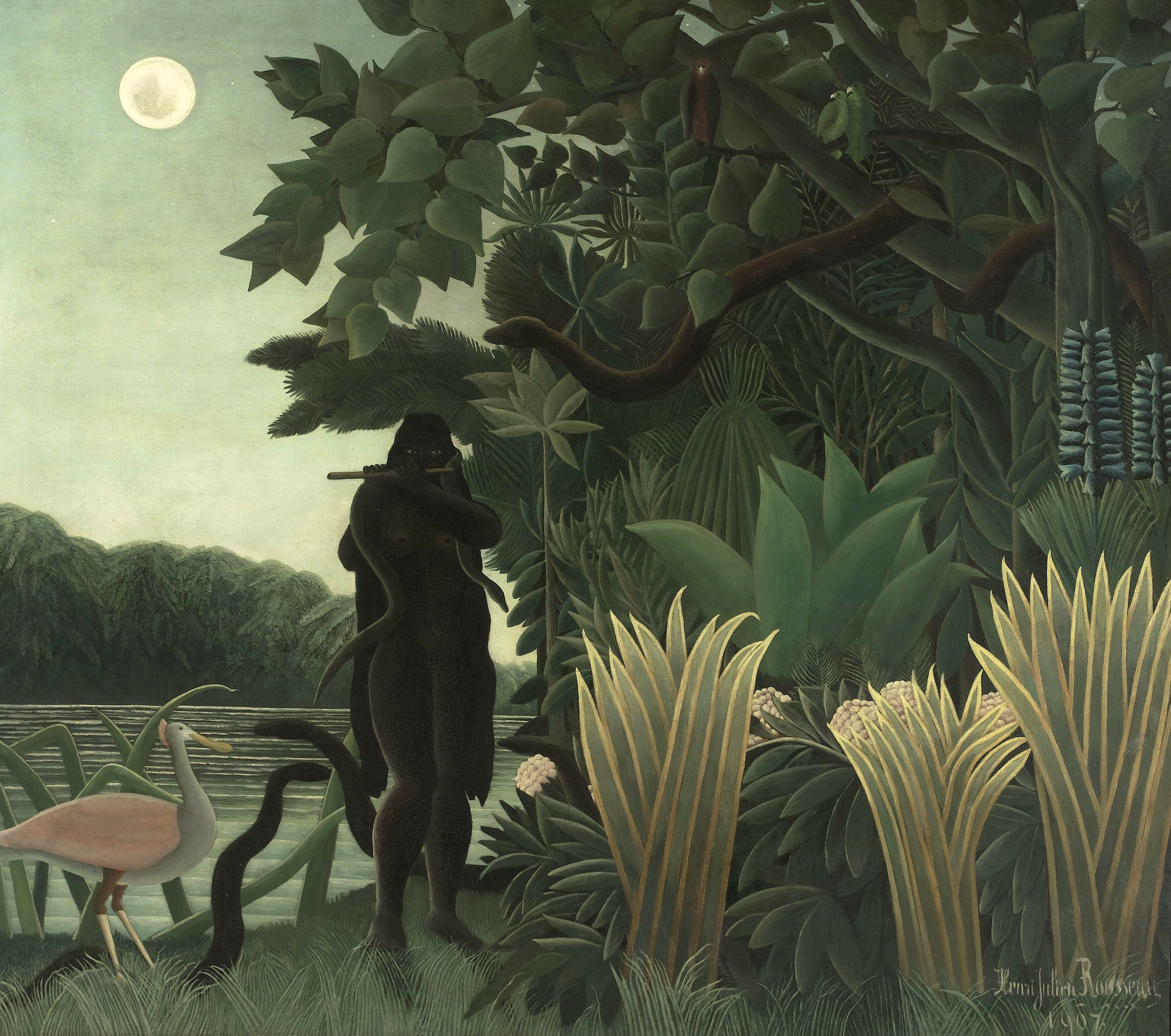
The Snake Charmer, 1907, Musée d'Orsay

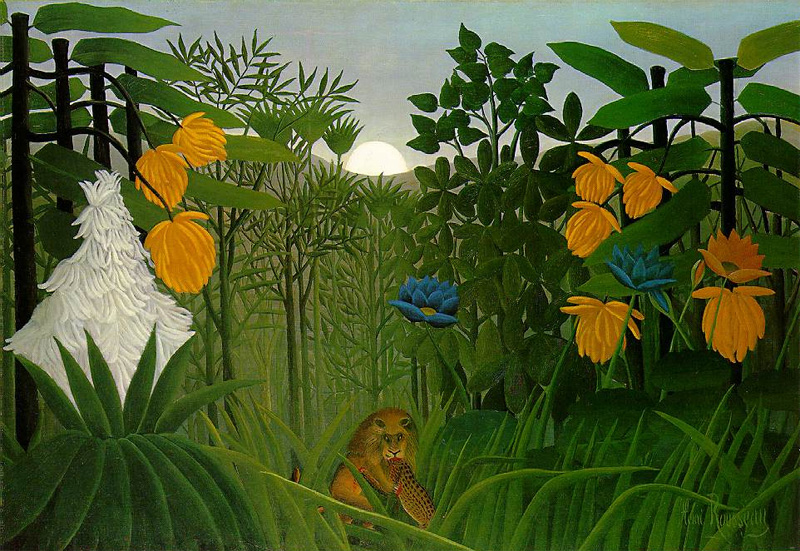
The Repast of the Lion, c.1907, Metropolitan Museum of Art

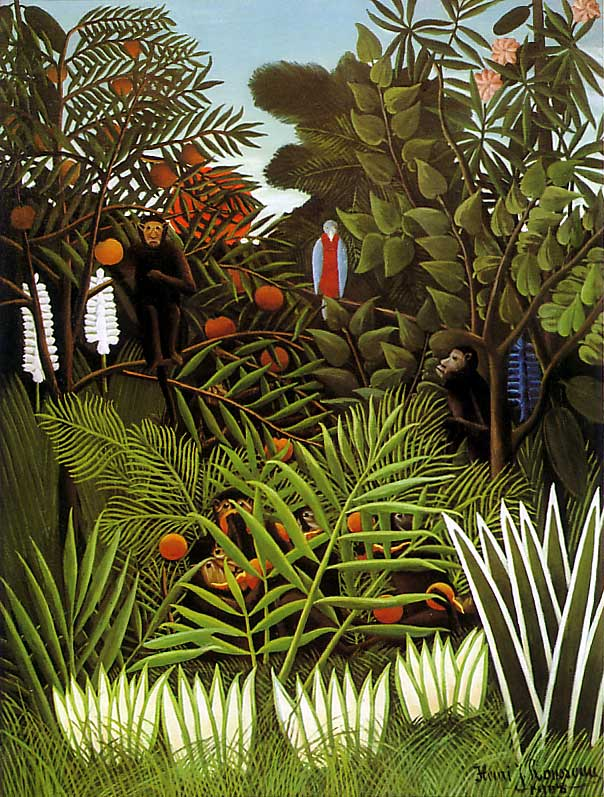
Exotic Landscape, 1908, Private collection

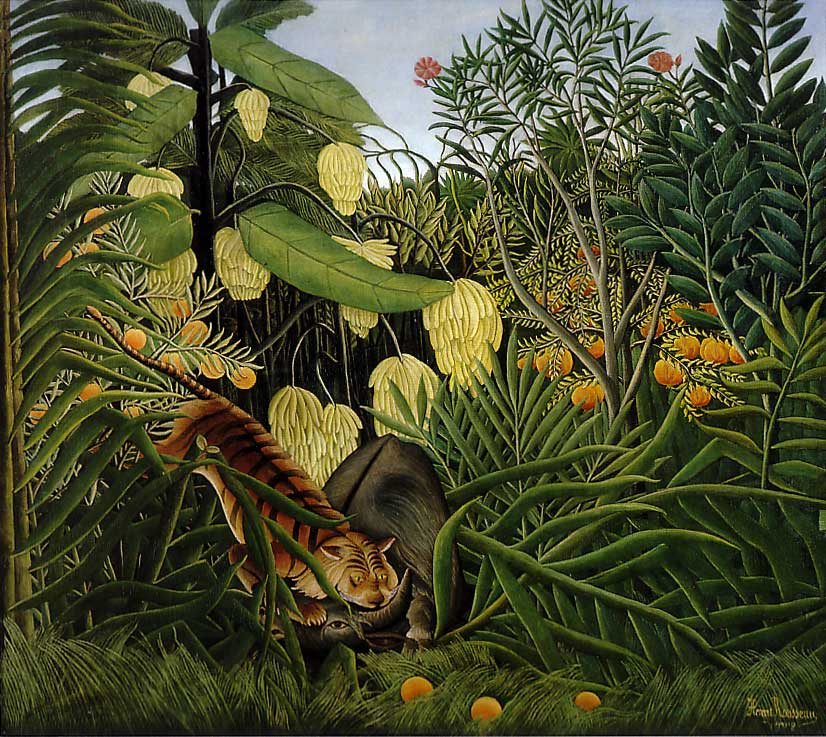
Fight Between a Tiger and a Buffalo, 1908, Cleveland Museum of Art

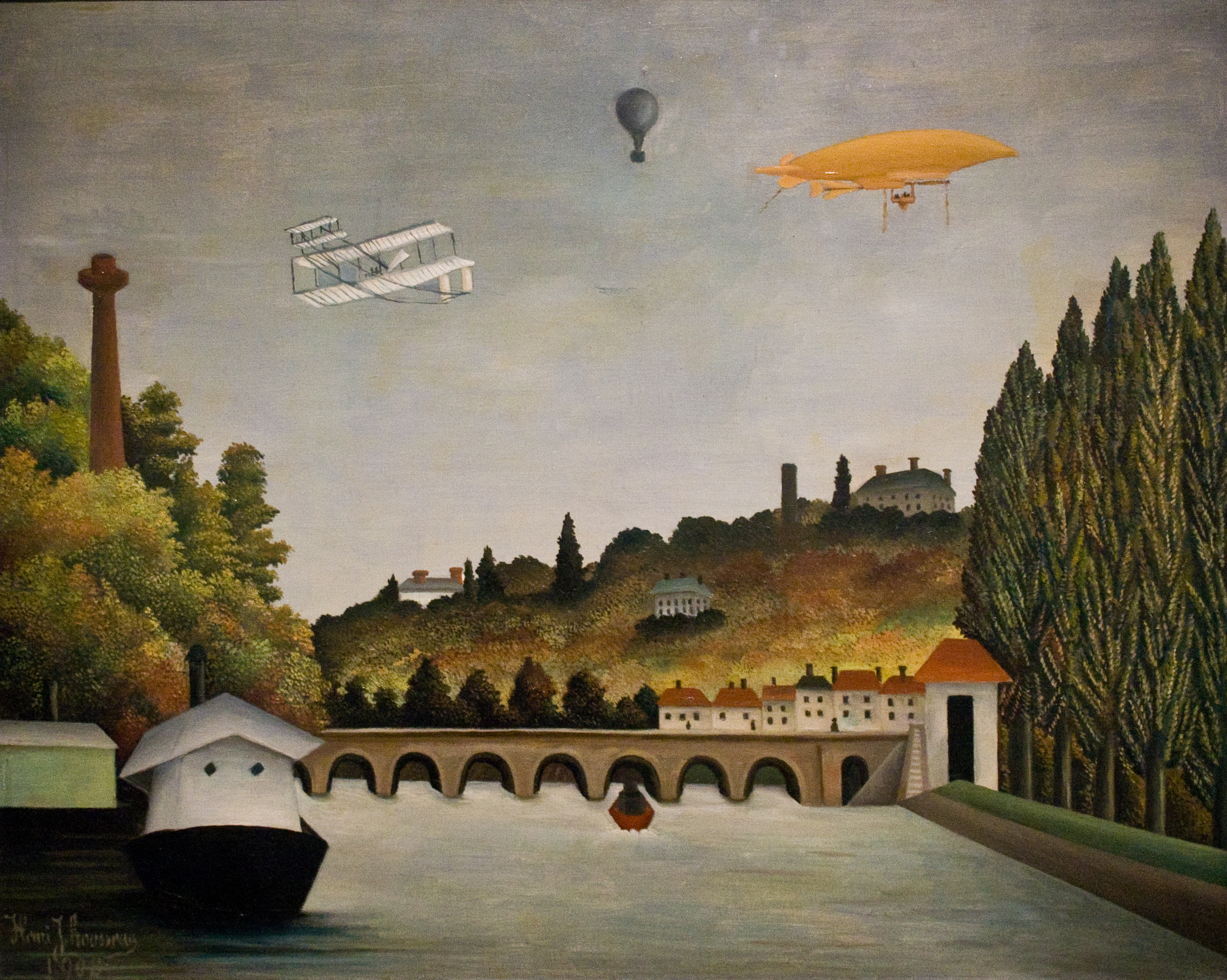
View of the Bridge in Sevres and the Hills of Clamart, Saint-Cloud and Bellevue with biplane, balloon and dirigible, 1908, Pushkin Museum

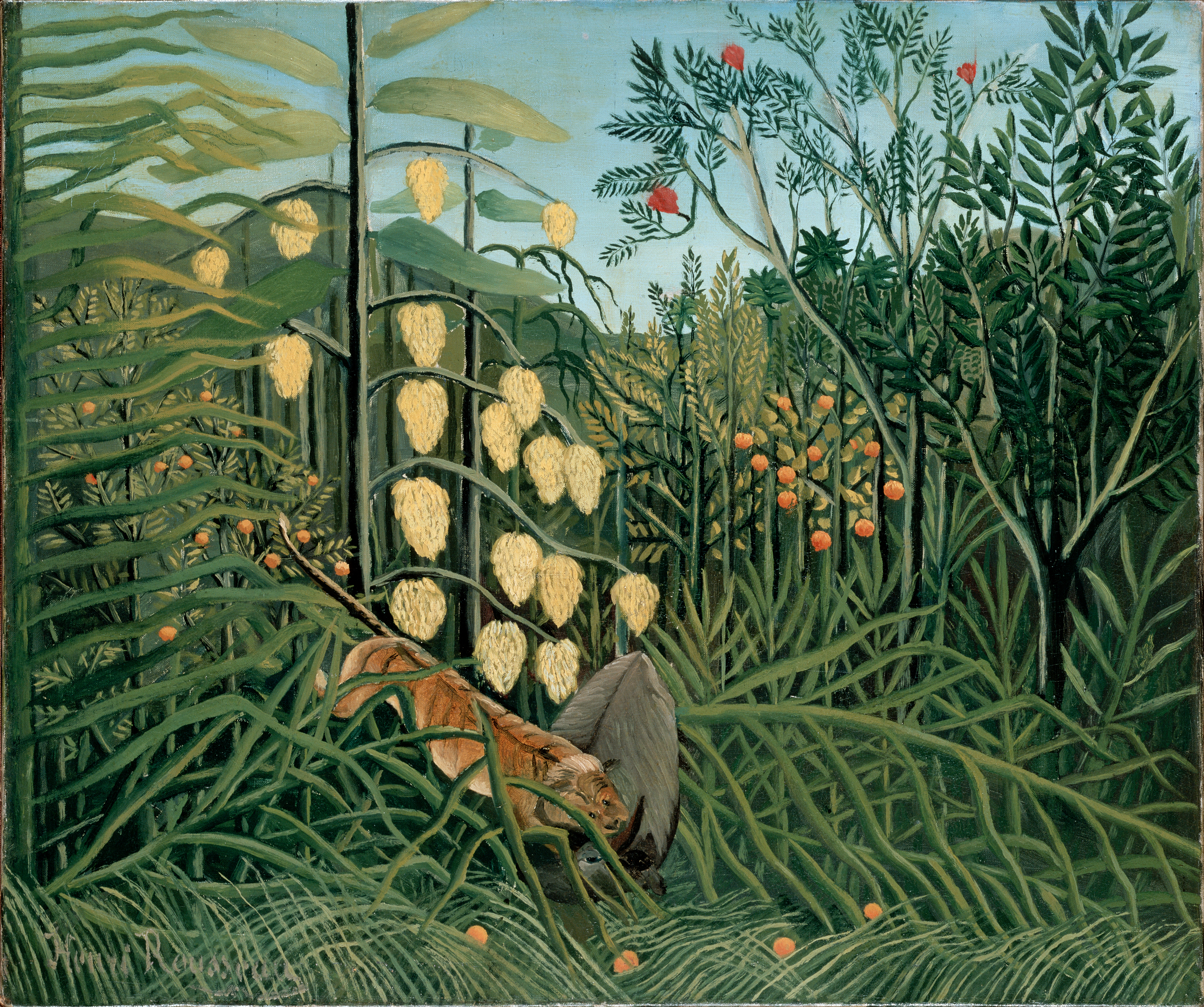
In a Tropical Forest Combat of a Tiger and a Buffalo, 1908–1909, Hermitage Museum

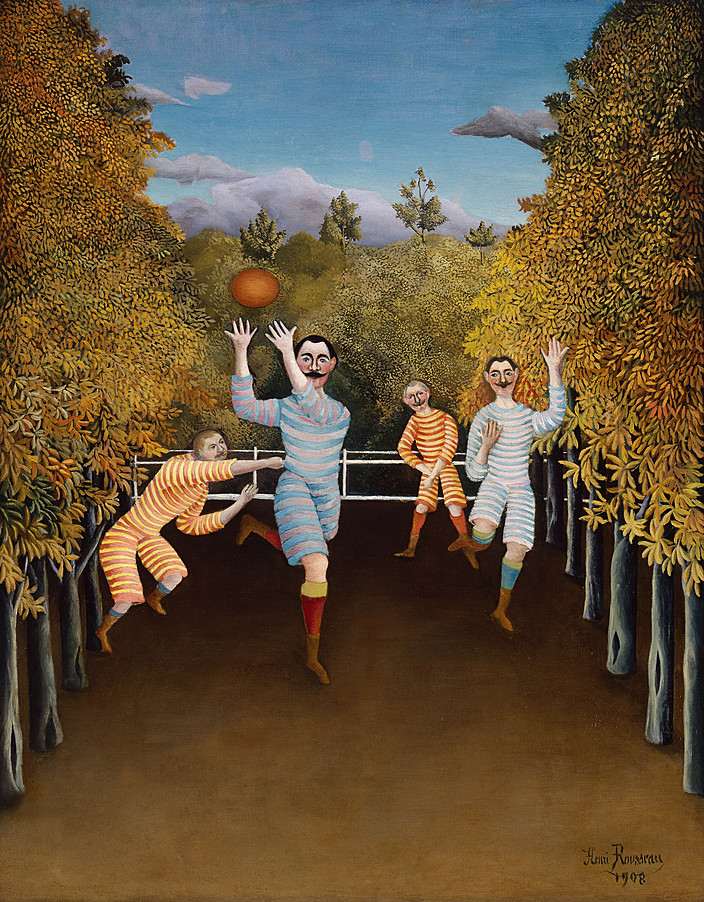
The Football Players, 1908, Solomon R. Guggenheim Museum

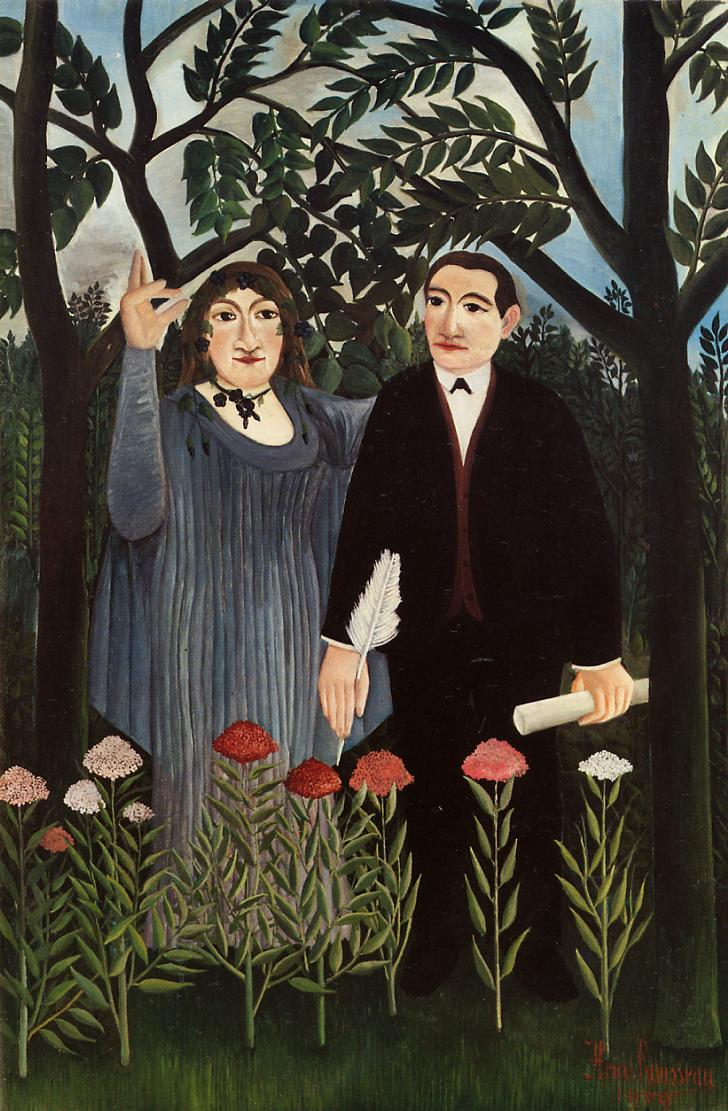
Muse Inspiring the Poet (Portrait of Guillaume Apollinaire and Marie Laurencin), 1909, Kunstmuseum Basel

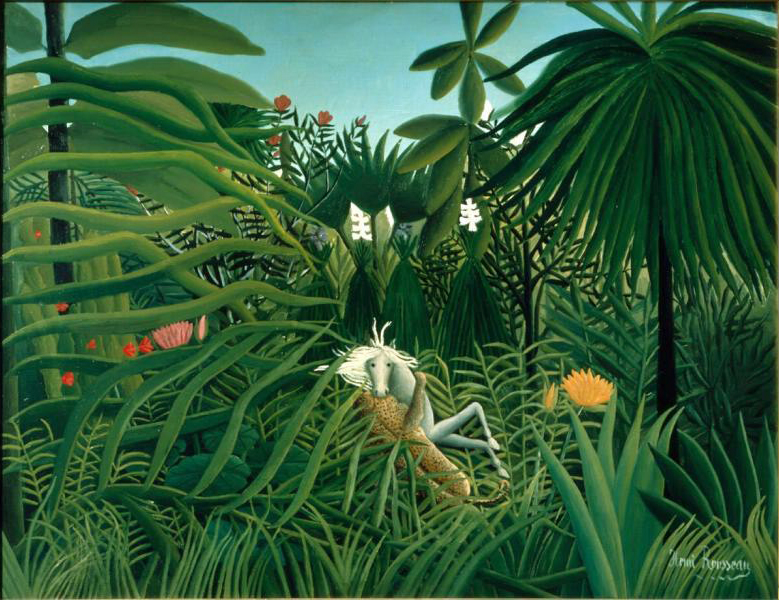
Jaguar Attacking a Horse, 1910, Pushkin Museum

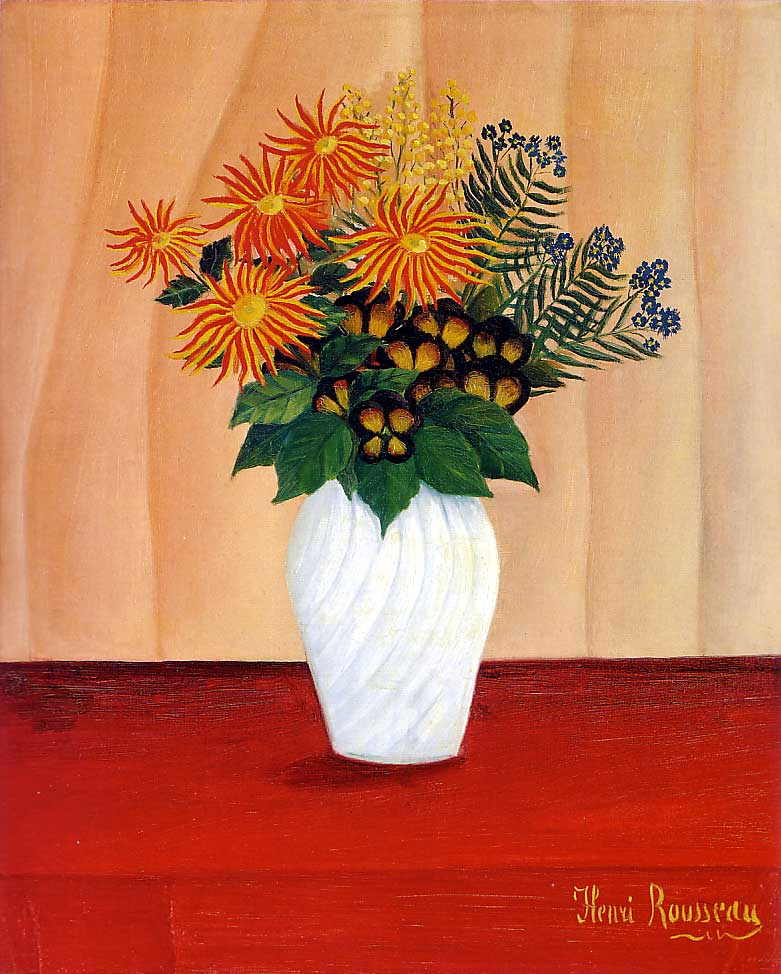
Bouquet of Flowers, 1910, Tate Gallery

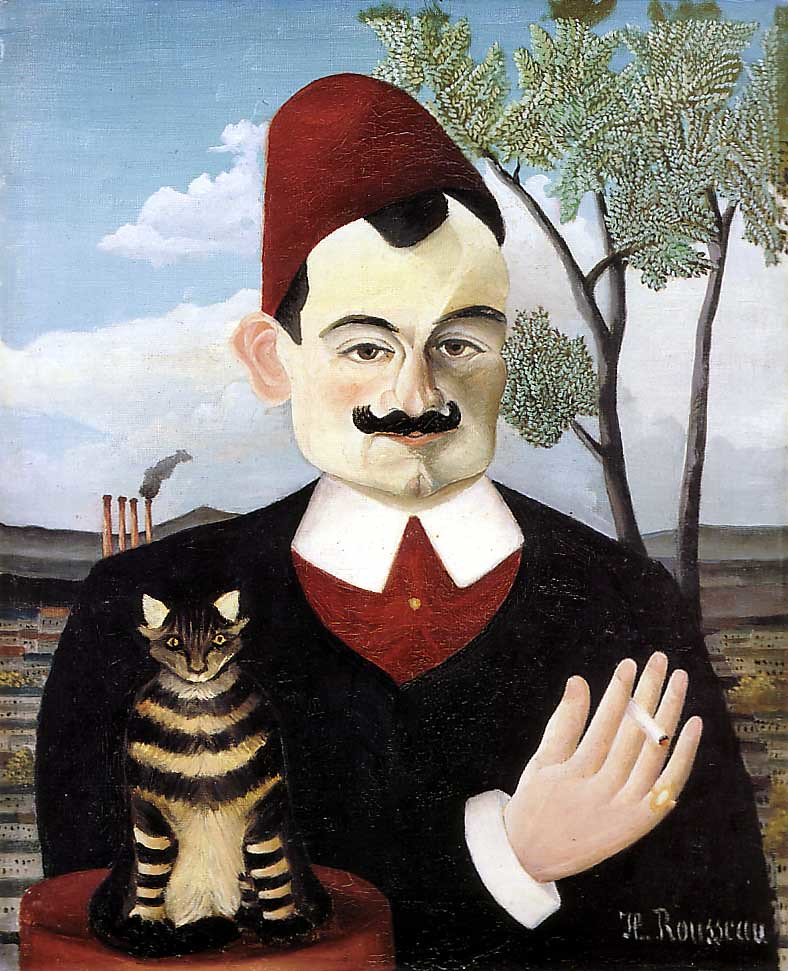
Pierre Loti, 1910, Kunsthaus Zürich
