= Boy on the Rocks =

Painting by Henri Rousseau

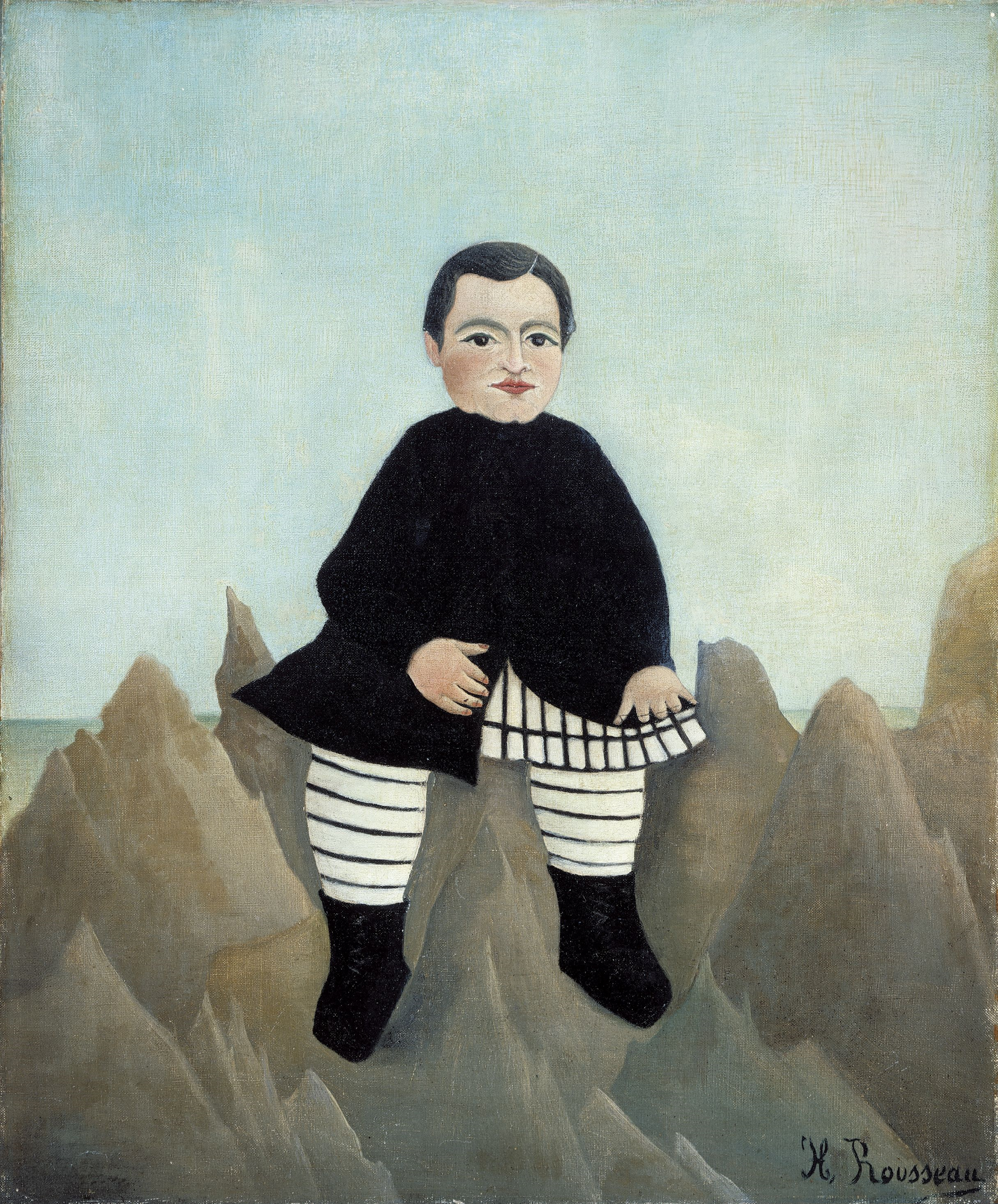
- Artist: Henri Rousseau
- Year: 1895–1897
- Medium: oil on linen
- Dimensions: 55.4 cm × 45.7 cm (21.8 in × 18.0 in)
- Location: National Gallery of Art, Washington, D.C.

Boy On The Rocks (French: Garçon sur les rochers) is a painting by French artist Henri Rousseau. It is an oil on canvas and was created sometime between 1895 and 1897. The painting was purchased by art collector Chester Dale in 1927 and was subsequently bequeathed to the National Gallery of Art in Washington, D.C. in 1963.

Rousseau's work has been described as having a "mysterious poetry" and a "dreamlike force". According to Nicolas Pioch's comments on the painting:

"Only a child can so bestride the world with such ease, and only a childlike artist with a simple, naïve vision can understand this elevation and make us see it as dauntingly true."

The painting was used on the cover of the May 19, 1999, issue of the Journal of the American Medical Association.
