= The Dream (Rousseau) =

Painting by Henri Rousseau

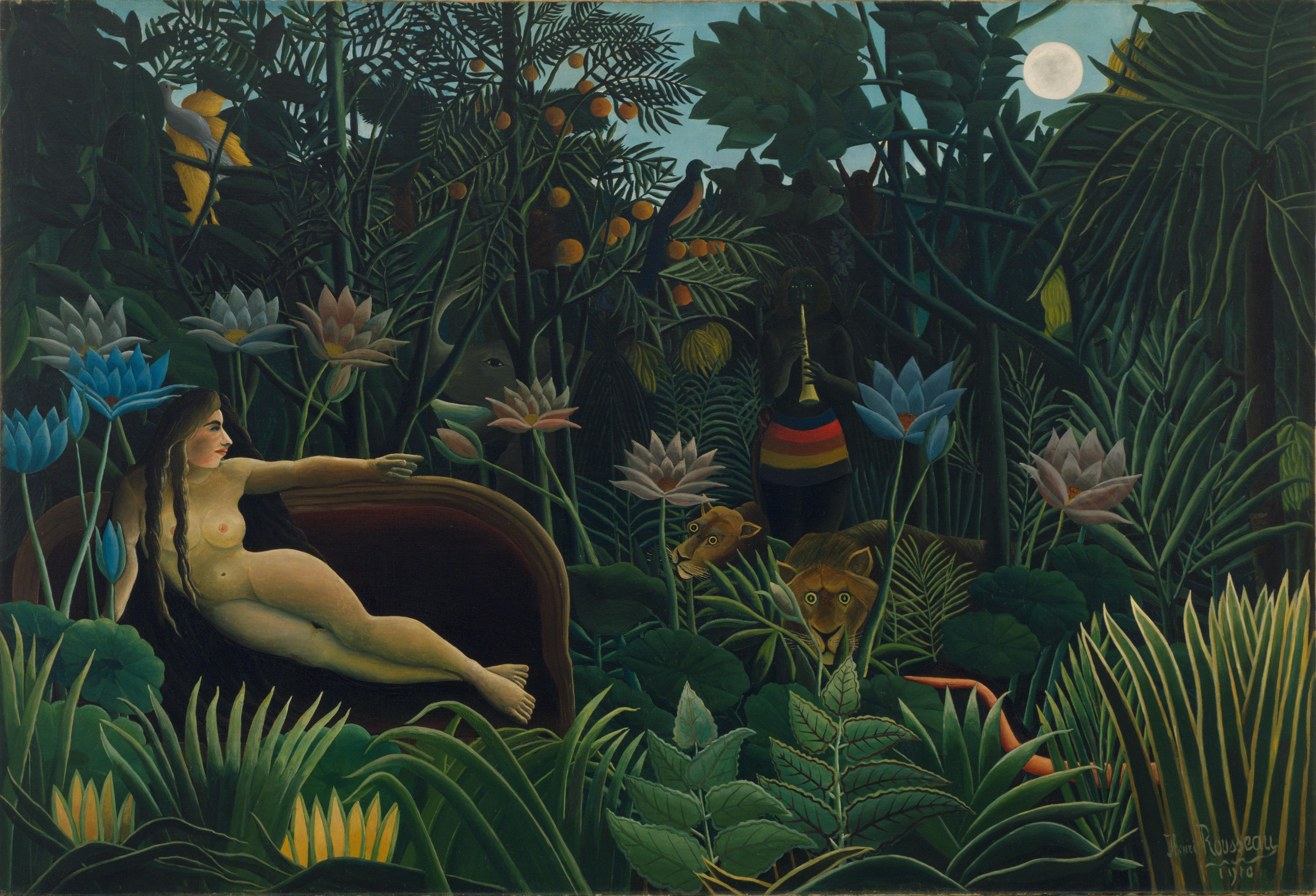
- Artist: Henri Rousseau
- Year: 1910
- Catalogue: 79277
- Medium: Oil on canvas
- Dimensions: 204.5 cm × 298.5 cm (80.5 in × 117.5 in)
- Location: Museum of Modern Art, New York
- Accession: 252.1954

The Dream (French: Le Rêve; occasionally also known as Le Songe or Rêve exotique) is a large oil-on-canvas painting created by Henri Rousseau in 1910, one of more than 25 Rousseau paintings with a jungle theme. His last completed work, it was first exhibited at the Salon des Indépendants from 18 March to 1 May 1910, a few months before his death on 2 September 1910. Rousseau's earlier works had received a negative reception, but poet and critic Guillaume Apollinaire remarked on its debut: "The picture radiates beauty, that is indisputable. I believe nobody will laugh this year."

The Dream is the largest of the jungle paintings, measuring 6' 8½" × 9' 9½" (204.5 × 298.5 cm). It features an almost surreal portrait of Yadwigha (Jadwiga), Rousseau's Polish mistress from his youth, lying naked on a divan to the left of the painting, gazing over a landscape of lush jungle foliage, including lotus flowers, and animals including birds, monkeys, an elephant, a lion and lioness, and a snake. The stylised forms of the jungle plants are based on Rousseau's observations at the Paris Museum of Natural History and its Jardin des Plantes. The nude's left arm reaches towards the lions and a black snake charmer who faces the viewer playing his flute, barely visible in the gloom of the jungle under the dim light of the full moon. A pink-bellied snake slithers through the undergrowth, its sinuous form reflecting the curves of the woman's hips and leg.

Suspecting that some viewers did not understand the painting, Rousseau wrote a poem to accompany it, Inscription pour Le Rêve:

Yadwigha dans un beau rêve
S'étant endormie doucement
Entendait les sons d'une musette
Dont jouait un charmeur bien pensant.
Pendant que la lune reflète
Sur les fleuves [or fleurs], les arbres verdoyants,
Les fauves serpents prêtent l'oreille
Aux airs gais de l'instrument.

Translation:

Yadwigha in a beautiful dream
Having fallen gently to sleep
Heard the sounds of a reed instrument
Played by a well-intentioned [snake] charmer.
As the moon reflected
On the rivers [or flowers], the verdant trees,
The wild snakes lend an ear
To the joyous tunes of the instrument.

One possible interpretation of the painting, offered by Rousseau in a letter to art critic André Dupont, is that it depicts a woman reclining on a couch in Paris, dreaming she is listening to a flute player in the jungle.

The subject of a reclining nude draws from a classical tradition, from Titian’s 1538 painting Venus of Urbino to Manet's 1863 painting Olympia. Rousseau may have taken some inspiration from Émile Zola's novel Le Rêve, which deals with the love between a painter and an embroideress. While he was painting The Dream, Rousseau was romantically involved with a shop assistant, Leonie.

French art dealer Ambroise Vollard bought the painting from Rousseau in February 1910. It was sold through Knoedler Galleries in New York to clothing manufacturer and art collector Sidney Janis in January 1934. Janis sold the painting to Nelson A. Rockefeller in 1954, who donated it to the Museum of Modern Art, New York to celebrate the Museum's 25th anniversary. It remains on display at MoMA.
