= Myself, Portrait-Landscape =

Painting by Henri Rousseau

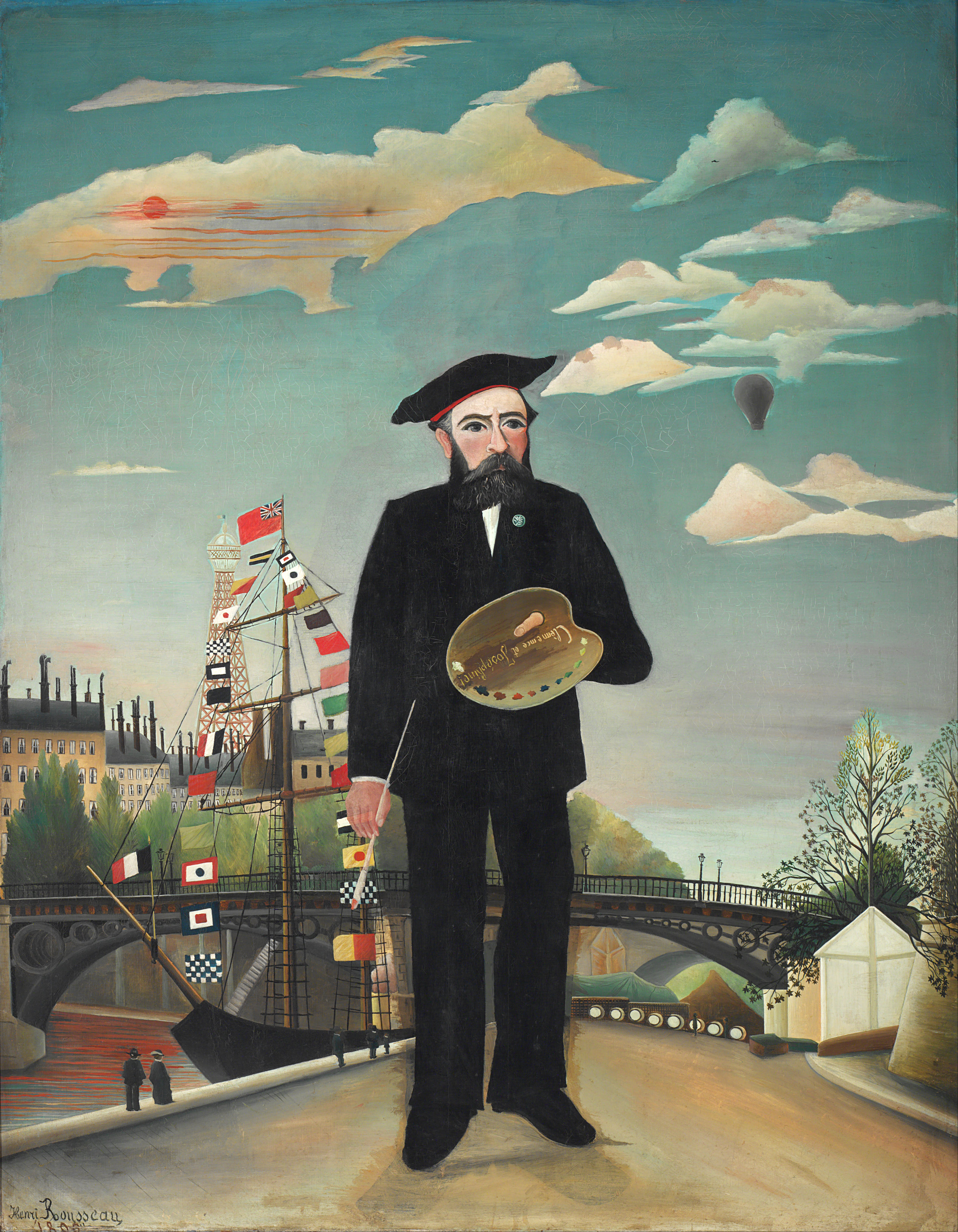
- Artist: Henri Rousseau
- Year: 1890
- Medium: Oil on canvas
- Dimensions: 146 cm × 113 cm (57 in × 44 in)
- Location: National Gallery Prague; Prague

Myself, Portrait-Landscape (French: Moi-même, portrait-paysage) is an oil on canvas self-portrait by Henri Rousseau, from 1890. It is held in the National Gallery Prague. It was chosen as one of the 105 decisive western paintings for Michel Butor's imaginary museum.

== History and description ==
Painted at the start of his career and exhibited at the 1890 salon des Indépendants, Rousseau chose its title to claim a neutral status for it between the usually totally distinct genres of portrait painting and landscape painting. It also shows him wearing as a buttonhole the insignia of the Ordre des Palmes académiques, which was awarded to a namesake of his but never to him, while his two wives' first names are on the palette (replacing an earlier idea of the inscription "To not forget" ("Pour ne pas les oublier"). As well as his private life, the idealised urban background shows elements of contemporary life - the now lost metallic Pont du Carrousel, the shadow of a hot-air balloon and the new Eiffel Tower. - and (at top left) a red sun behind a cloud inspired by Jean-Léon Gérôme's 1884 Les deux majestés.
