= Félix Auguste Clément =

French painter (1826–1888)

- Born: 20 May 1826; Donzère, France
- Died: 2 February 1888 (aged 61); Algiers
- Education: École nationale des beaux-arts de Lyon; École nationale des beaux-arts de Lyon
- Movement: Orientalist
- Children: Felix Clemente

Félix Auguste Clément (20 May 1826 – 2 February 1888) was a French painter, known primarily for his Orientalist scenes.

== Biography ==
Clément was born in Donzère. His first studies were at the École nationale des beaux-arts de Lyon with Jean-Claude Bonnefond. In 1848, he entered the École des Beaux-Arts in Paris, where he studied with Michel Martin Drolling and François-Édouard Picot. He was awarded the Prix de Rome in 1856 for his painting of the return of young Tobias.

He stayed in Rome for several years, followed by a visit to Egypt in 1862, where he painted scenes of princely activities, did decorative work for palaces and sketched monuments; some of them quite remote. Many works were created by request of the Khedive.

In 1868, he returned to France. Four years later, he was commissioned by the government to copy the paintings of Andrea Mantegna in Padua, but was forced to return by illness. He was a professor at the École Nationale in Lyon from 1874 to 1877, then retired.

He participated in the Second Annual International Exhibition of London (1872), Expo Vienna 1873 and the Exposition Universelle (1878). It is reported that Henri Rousseau obtained Clément's help in gaining permission to copy paintings at the Louvre; a privilege normally reserved for students of recognized institutions.

He died in Algiers, where he had spent the winter attempting to restore his health.

== Selected paintings ==
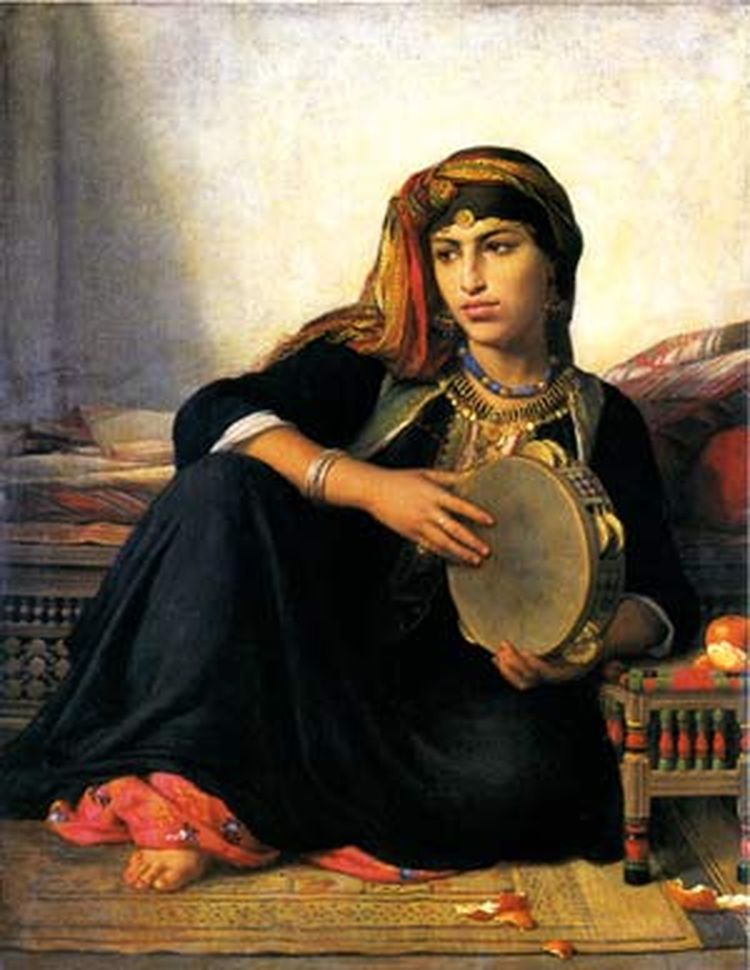
Playing the Tambourine

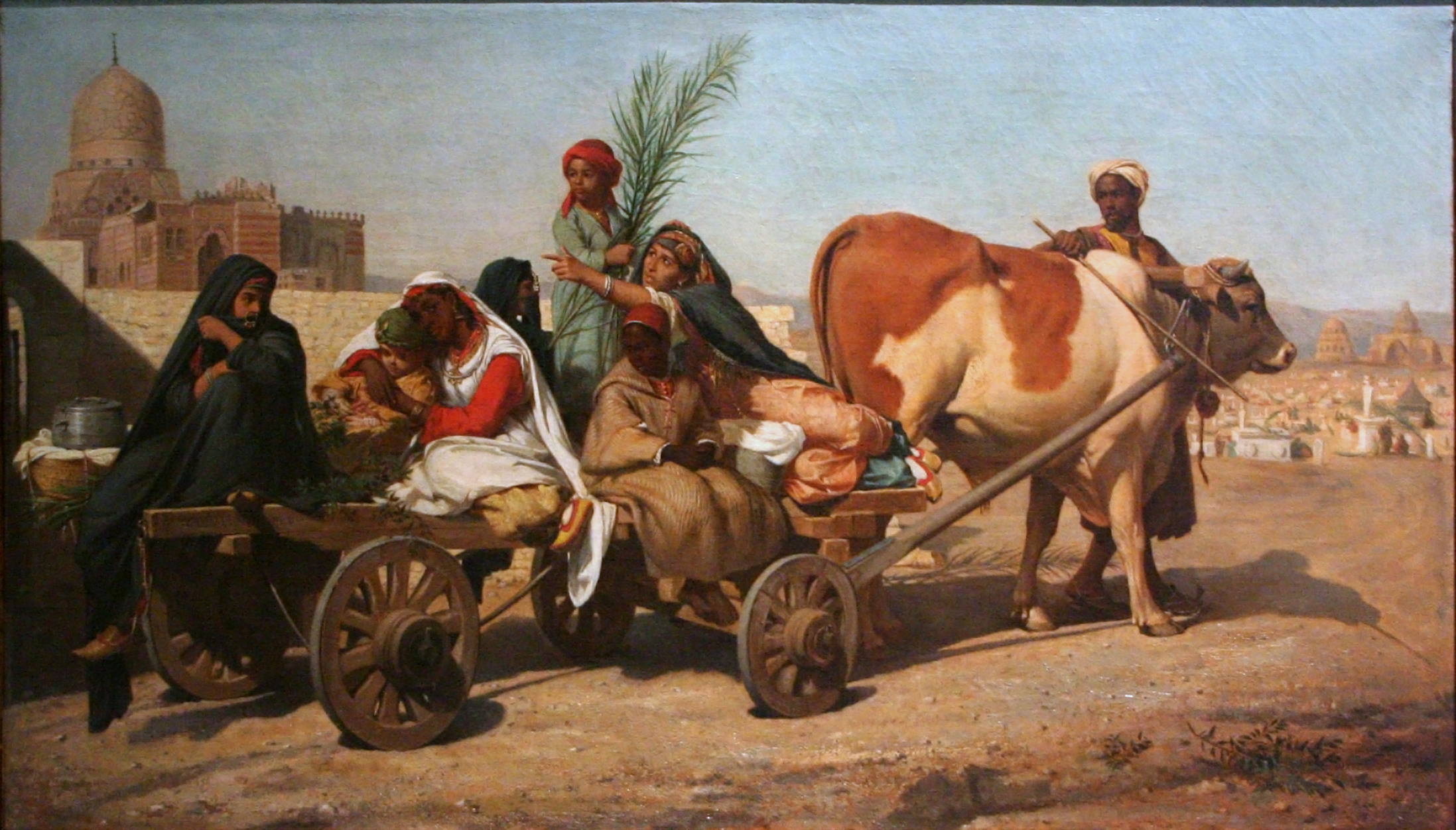
Egyptian Cart

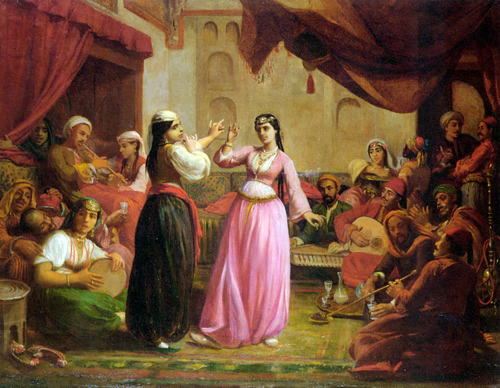
An Evening's Entertainment

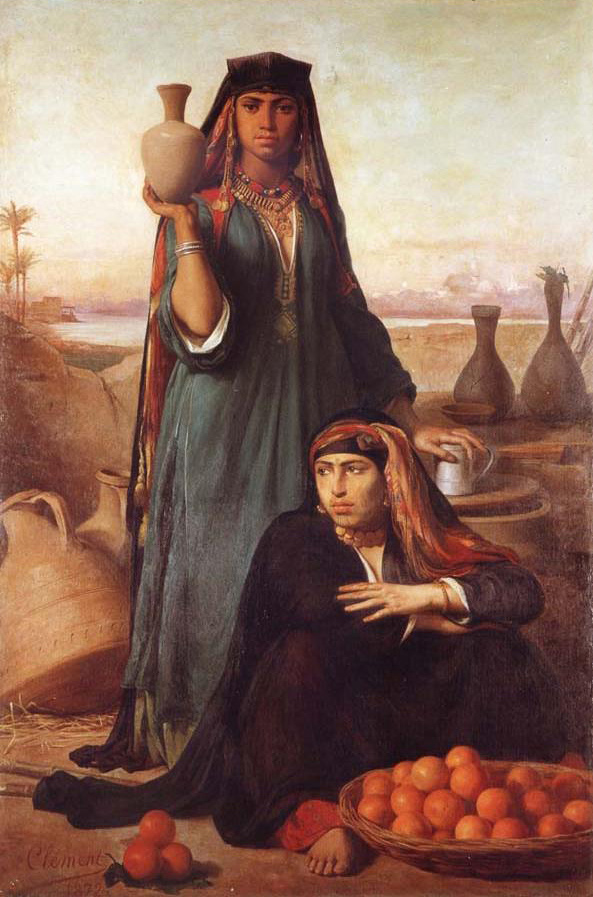
Women Selling
Water and Oranges

== See also ==
- List of Orientalist artists
