= The Repast of the Lion =

Painting by Henri Rousseau

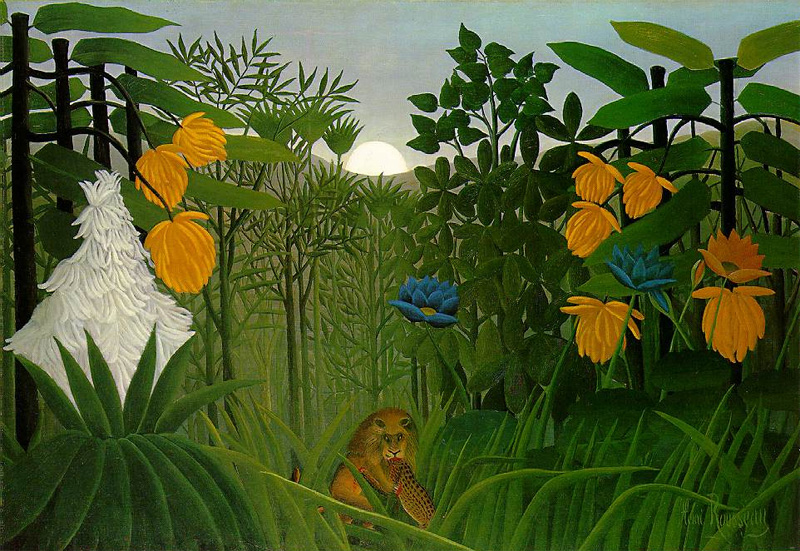
- Artist: Henri Rousseau
- Year: c. 1907
- Medium: Oil on canvas
- Dimensions: 113.7 cm × 160 cm (44.8 in × 63 in)
- Location: Metropolitan Museum of Art; New York

The Repast of the Lion is an early 20th century painting by French Post-Impressionist Henri Rousseau. Done in oil on canvas, the work depicts a feeding lion in a jungle setting. The painting expands upon some of Rousseau's late 19th century work, and the foliage depicted in the painting was inspired by the artist's studying of Paris' botanical gardens. The work is currently on display at the Metropolitan Museum of Art.
