= The Sleeping Gypsy =

1897 painting by Henri Rousseau

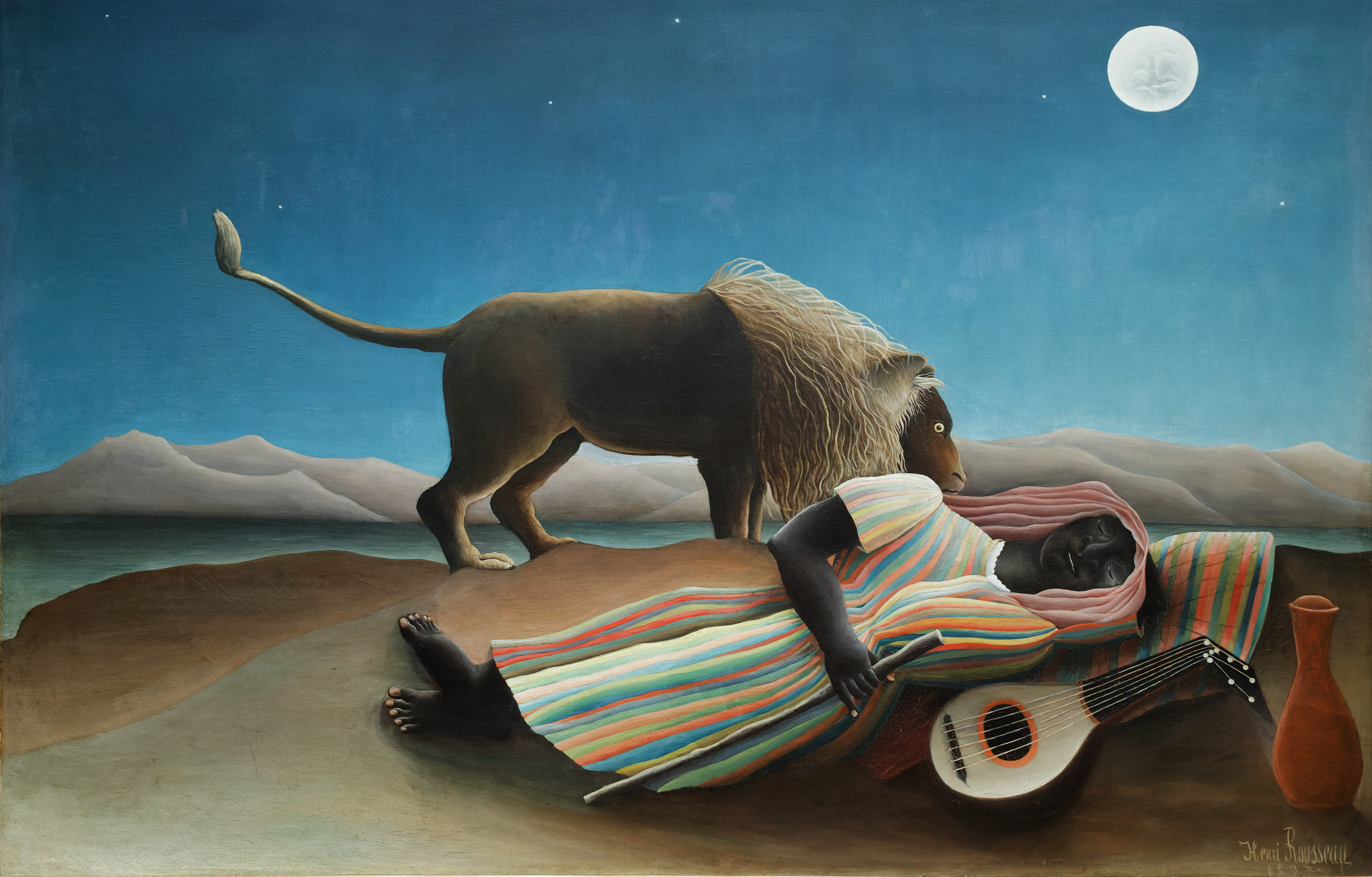
- Artist: Henri Rousseau
- Year: 1897
- Catalogue: 80172
- Medium: oil on canvas
- Dimensions: 129.5 cm × 200.7 cm (51.0 in × 79.0 in)
- Location: Museum of Modern Art, New York City
- Accession: 646.1939

The Sleeping Gypsy (French: La Bohémienne endormie) is an 1897 oil on canvas painting by the French Naïve artist Henri Rousseau (1844–1910). It is a fantastical depiction of a lion musing over a sleeping woman on a moonlit night. It is held by the Museum of Modern Art in New York City, to which it was donated by Olga Guggenheim in 1939. In the museum, the painting is housed next to Vincent van Gogh's famous 1889 painting The Starry Night.

The painting was featured in the 1980 BBC Two series 100 Great Paintings.

== Description ==
Rousseau described his painting as follows: "A wandering Negress, a mandolin player, lies with her jar beside her (a vase with drinking water), overcome by fatigue in a deep sleep. A lion chances to pass by, picks up her scent yet does not devour her. There is a moonlight effect, very poetic. The scene is set in a completely arid desert. The gypsy is dressed in oriental costume."

In the painting, a dark-skinned woman – the Romany gypsy of the title, variously linked in French literature to Bohemia or to Egypt – is sleeping in an arid landscape with mountains in the background, under a dark sky with a few stars and a full moon. She is wearing a long robe with a rainbow of colourful stripes, perhaps a djellaba or jellabiya, and lies upon a similarly striped cloth. Her right hand holds a staff, while beside her rests a mandolin and a tall jar with slim neck. While she continues to lie passively, a maned lion has approached and dips its head to cautiously sniff.

The painting measures 129.5 cm × 200.7 cm (51.0 in × 79.0 in). Although painted in a naïve manner, with simple shapes and large blocks of colour, the painting may be based on Rousseau's observations of animals at the Jardin des Plantes and of reconstructed colonial villages at the 1889 World's Fair in Paris.

== Provenance ==
Rousseau first exhibited the painting at the 13th Salon des Indépendants in 1897, and tried unsuccessfully to sell it to the mayor of his hometown, Laval. Instead, it entered the private collection of a Parisian charcoal merchant where it remained until 1924, when it was discovered and bought by the art critic Louis Vauxcelles. The Paris-based art dealer Daniel-Henry Kahnweiler purchased the painting in 1924, although a controversy arose over whether the painting was a forgery. It was acquired by art historian Alfred H. Barr Jr. for the New York Museum of Modern Art.

It was bought by John Quinn in 1924, and after his death later that year his estate sold at Hôtel Drouot to Henri Bing, who sold to Mme Emma Ruckstuhl of Küssnacht in Switzerland. She sold to Olga (Hirsch) Guggenheim (who was married to Simon Guggenheim) in December 1939, who donated it to the Museum of Modern Art.

In a Season 28 segment of Sesame Street, Baby Bear shows Big Bird "The Sleeping Gypsy" painting at the Museum of Modern Art in Episode 3529. By imagining the sounds coming from the painting, they can almost hear them. In the segment, the mandolin was misreferred to as a lute.

The painting also became the subject of a Between the Lions episode, in which the cubs try to tell their own stories based on the painting. In the episode, the mandolin was misreferred to several times as a lute.
