= Tiger in a Tropical Storm =

Painting by Henri Rousseau

Tiger in a Tropical Storm (Surprised!)
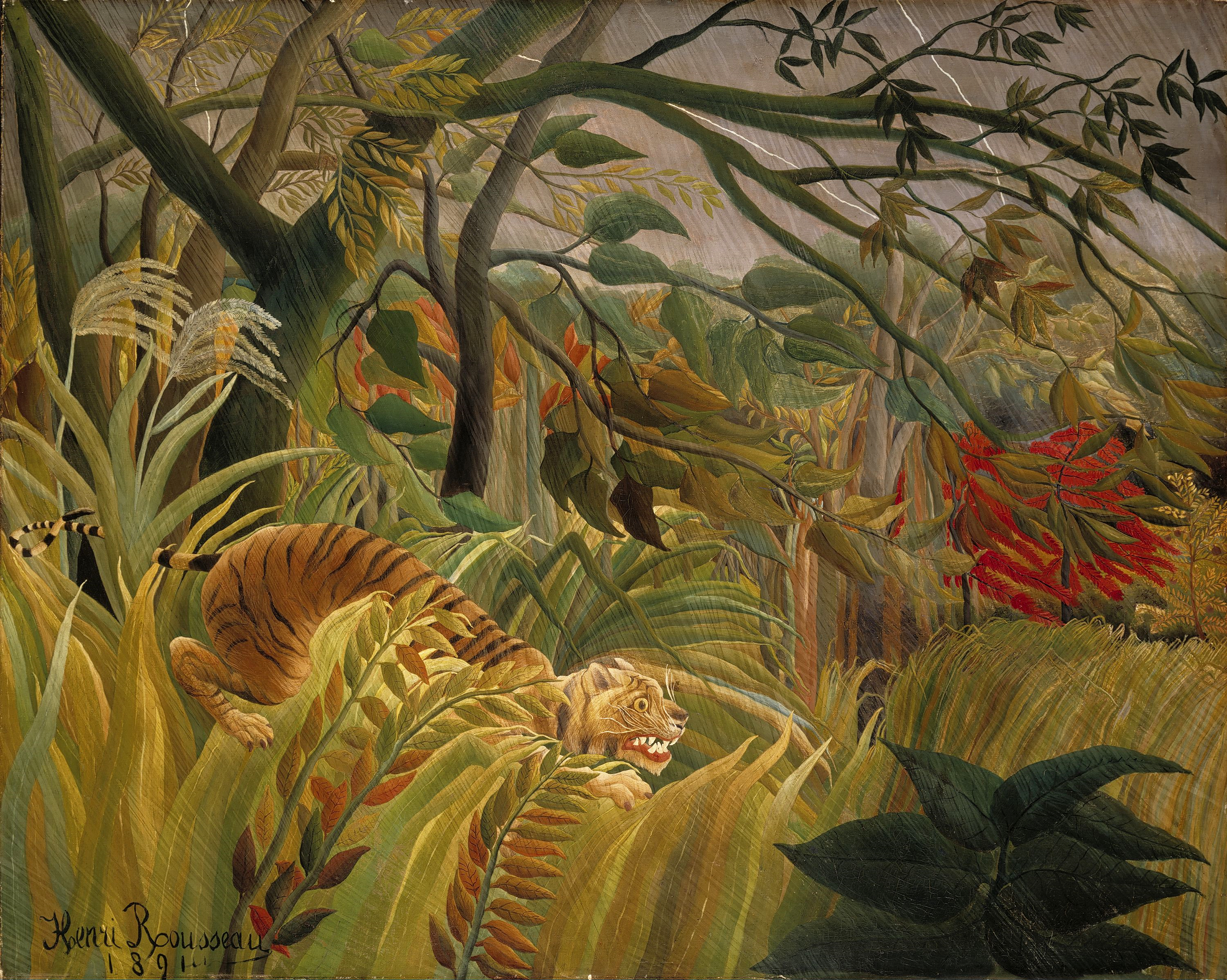
- Artist: Henri Rousseau
- Year: 1891
- Medium: Oil on canvas
- Dimensions: 130 cm × 162 cm (51 1/8 in × 63 3/4 in)
- Location: National Gallery, London

Tiger in a Tropical Storm or Surprised! is an 1891 oil-on-canvas painting by Henri Rousseau. It was the first of the jungle paintings for which the artist is chiefly known. It shows a tiger, illuminated by a flash of lightning, preparing to pounce on its prey in the midst of a raging gale.

Unable to have a painting accepted by the jury of the Académie des Beaux-Arts, Rousseau exhibited Tiger in a Tropical Storm in 1891 under the title Surpris!, at the Salon des Indépendants, which was unjuried and open to all artists. The painting received mixed reviews. Rousseau had been a late developer: his first known work, Landscape with a Windmill, was not produced until he was 35, and his work is marked by a naïveté of composition that belies its technical complexity. Most critics mocked Rousseau's work as childish, but Félix Vallotton, a young Swiss painter who was later to be an important figure in the development of the modern woodcut, said of it:

His tiger surprising its prey is a 'must-see'; it's the alpha and omega of painting and so disconcerting that, before so much competency and childish naïveté, the most deeply rooted convictions are held up and questioned.

The scared tiger in Henri's painting is derived from a motif found in the drawings and paintings of Eugène Delacroix. It was claimed, either by Rousseau himself or by his friends and admirers, that he had experienced life in the jungle during his time in Mexico in 1860, where he had served as a regimental bandsman. In fact he never left France, and it is thought that his inspiration came from the botanical gardens of Paris, such as the Jardin des Plantes (which included zoological galleries with taxidermy specimens of exotic animals), and from prints and books. The fin de siècle French populace was captivated by exotic and dangerous subjects, such as the perceived savagery of animals and peoples of distant lands. Tigers on the prowl had been the subject of an exhibition at the 1885 École des Beaux-Arts. Emmanuel Frémiet's famous sculpture of 1887 depicting a gorilla carrying a woman exuded more savagery than anything in Rousseau's canvases, yet was found acceptable as art; Rosseau's poor immediate reception therefore seems the result of his style and not his subject matter.

The tiger's prey is beyond the edge of the canvas, so it is left to the imagination of the viewer to decide what the outcome will be, although Rousseau's original title Surprised! suggests the tiger has the upper hand. Rousseau later stated that the tiger was about to pounce on a group of explorers. Despite their apparent simplicity, Rousseau's jungle paintings were built up meticulously in layers, using a large number of green shades to capture the lush exuberance of the jungle. He also devised his own method for depicting the lashing rain by trailing strands of silver paint diagonally across the canvas, a technique inspired by the satin-like finishes of the paintings of William-Adolphe Bouguereau.

Although Tiger in a Tropical Storm brought him his first recognition, and he continued to exhibit his work annually at the Salon des Indépendants, Rousseau did not return to the jungle theme for another seven years, with the exhibition of Struggle for Life (now lost) at the 1898 Salon. Responses to his work were little changed; following this exhibition, one critic wrote, "Rousseau continued to express his visions on canvas in implausible jungles... grown from the depths of a lake of absinthe, he shows us the bloody battles of animals escaped from the wooden-horse-maker". Another five years passed before the next jungle scene, Scouts Attacked by a Tiger (1904). The tiger appears in at least three more of his paintings: Tiger Hunt (c. 1895), in which humans are the predators; Jungle with Buffalo Attacked by a Tiger (1908); and Fight Between a Tiger and a Buffalo (1908).

His work continued to be derided by the critics up to and after his death in 1910, but he won a following among his contemporaries: Picasso, Matisse, and Toulouse-Lautrec were all admirers of his work. Around 1908, the art dealer Ambroise Vollard purchased Surprised! and two other works from Rousseau, who had offered them at a rate considerably higher than the 190 francs he finally received. The painting was later purchased by the National Gallery, London in 1972 with a contribution from the billionaire philanthropist Walter Annenberg.
