= Guy Cogeval =

French art historian (1955–2025)

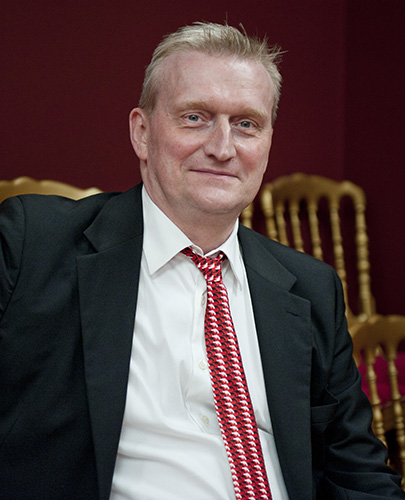
- Cogeval in 2012
- Born: Guy Louis Antonio Cogeval; 13 October 1955; Paris, France
- Died: 13 November 2025 (aged 70); Paris, France
- Occupation: Art historian

Guy Louis Antonio Cogeval (13 October 1955 – 13 November 2025) was a French art historian. A recipient of the Legion of Honour, he served as president of the Musée d'Orsay and the Musée de l'Orangerie from 2008 to 2017.

Cogeval died at his home in Paris, on 13 November 2025, at the age of 70.
