= Deaths in July 1992 =

The following is a list of notable deaths in July 1992.

Entries for each day are listed alphabetically by surname. A typical entry lists information in the following sequence:

- Name, age, country of citizenship at birth, subsequent country of citizenship (if applicable), reason for notability, cause of death (if known), and reference.

== July 1992 ==
=== 1 ===
- Franco Cristaldi, 61, Italian film producer.
- Stan Frazier, 54, American professional wrestler, kidney failure.
- Jack Hood, 89, British boxing champion.
- Ewing Thomas Kerr, 92, American district judge.
- Sidney Meredith, 69, American literary agent.
- Brian O'Brien, 94, American optical physicist.
- Władysław Pawłowski, 76, Polish footballer.
- T. Prakash Rao, 67, Indian filmmaker.
- Newton Ogilvie Thompson, 88, South African judge, Chief Justice of South Africa (1971–1974).

=== 2 ===
- Lyle Boren, 83, American politician, member of the U.S. House of Representatives (1937–1947).
- Charles F. Brannan, 88, American politician, Secretary of Agriculture (1948–1953).
- Camarón de la Isla, 41, Spanish flamenco singer, lung cancer.
- Hans Jendretzky, 94, German communist politician.
- Juan Kavanagh, 60, Venezuelan Olympic fencer (1952).
- Borislav Pekić, 62, Serbian author, lung cancer.

=== 3 ===
- Arnold Belkin, 61, Canadian-Mexican painter.
- Ed Berrang, 69, American football player (Washington Redskins, Detroit Lions, Green Bay Packers).
- Jeanine Delpech, 86, French novelist.
- Wally Kilrea, 83, Canadian ice hockey player.
- Luigi Marchisio, 83, Italian road racing cyclist.
- Enzo Matteucci, 58, Italian football player, ALS.
- Koroglu Rahimov, 38, Azerbaijani division commander and war hero, killed in action.
- Anne Parsons, Countess of Rosse, 90, English socialite.
- George Staller, 76, American baseball player (Philadelphia Athletics), scout and coach (Baltimore Orioles).
- Clive Stoneham, 83, Australian politician.
- Marc H. Tanenbaum, 66, American rabbi and social justice activist, heart failure.
- Slim Vaughan, 82, American baseball player.

=== 4 ===
- David Abercrombie, 82, British phonetician.
- Djatikoesoemo, 75, Indonesian Army officer and diplomat.
- Adam Filipczak, 77, American basketball player.
- Harry Gottlieb, 96, American painter, lithographer, and educator, Alzheimer's disease.
- Joe Newman, 69, American jazz trumpeter, complications from a stroke.
- Francis Perrin, 90, French physicist.
- Astor Piazzolla, 71, Argentine tango musician, complications from a cerebral hemorrhage.
- Richard Smart, 79, American musical theatre actor and singer.
- Subaru Takahashi, 89, Japanese Olympic cross-country skier (1928).
- Lyudmila Tselikovskaya, 72, Russian actress, cancer.

=== 5 ===
- Georgia Brown, 58, English singer and actress, complications from surgery.
- Peter-Erich Cremer, 81, German U-boat commander during World War II.
- John Haas, 83, American Olympic canoeist (1952, 1956).
- Paul Hackman, 38, Canadian guitarist, traffic collision.
- Pauline Jewett, 69, Canadian politician, cancer.

=== 6 ===
- Frank Akins, 73, American gridiron football player (Washington Redskins).
- Amadeus August, 50, German actor and singer, AIDS-related complications.
- Marsha P. Johnson, 46, American LGBT activist and drag queen, head injury.
- Bryan Guinness, 2nd Baron Moyne, 86, British hereditary peer.
- Vsevolod Safonov, 66, Soviet actor of theatre and cinema, cancer.
- Mary Q. Steele, 70, American author.

=== 7 ===
- Josy Barthel, 65, Luxembourgish Olympic runner (1948, 1952, 1956).
- Grace Carlson, 85, American politician.
- Mika Feldman de Etchebéhère, 90, Argentine militant anarchist and marxist.
- Clint Frank, 76, American football player.
- Juanita Jackson Mitchell, 79, American lawyer.
- Vernon Smith, 32, American basketball player, shot.
- Pat Taaffe, 62, Irish jockey.

=== 8 ===
- Simcha Bunim Alter, 94, Israeli orthodox rabbi.
- Giacomo Conti, 74, Italian bobsledder and Olympic champion (1956).
- Zoltán Soós-Ruszka Hradetzky, 90, Hungarian sport shooter and Olympic medalist (1932, 1936).
- Ottfried Neubecker, 84, German vexillologist and heraldist.
- Nikolay Smirnov, 74, Soviet admiral.

=== 9 ===
- Kelvin Coe, 45, Australian ballet dancer, AIDS.
- Arne Falk-Rønne, 71, Danish travel writer.
- Raimundo Fernández-Cuesta, 95, Spanish Falange politician.
- Fikret Hodžić, 39, Yugoslav/Bosnian bodybuilder, murdered.
- Eric Sevareid, 79, American journalist, stomach cancer.

=== 10 ===
- Ion Bogdan, 77, Romanian football player.
- Walt Masters, 85, American baseball and gridiron football player.
- Albert Pierrepoint, 87, English executioner.
- Doris Tate, 68, American crime victims rights activist, brain cancer.

=== 11 ===
- Munroe Bourne, 82, Canadian Olympic swimmer (1928, 1932, 1936.
- Larry Cordner, 81, Australian rules footballer.
- Hajrudin Krvavac, 65, Bosnian film director.
- Constantin Pîrvulescu, 96, Romanian communist politician.
- Willem Welgemoed, 66, South African Olympic diver (1952).
- Deng Yingchao, 88, Chinese official, widow of Zhou Enlai.

=== 12 ===
- Reginald Beck, 90, British film editor.
- Elsie Driggs, 94, American painter.
- Ted Fenton, 77, English football player and manager, traffic collision.
- Al Gabriele, 75, American comic book artist.
- Caroline Pafford Miller, 88, American novelist.
- Bakhsheyis Pashayev, 56, Azerbaijani soldier, killed in battle.
- Carlo Van Neste, 78, Belgian violinist.
- Mariechen Wehselau, 86, American swimmer, Olympic champion (1924), and world record-holder.
- Edgar Bright Wilson, 83, American chemist.

=== 13 ===
- Giovanni Battista Breda, 60, Italian Olympic fencer (1960, 1964, 1968).
- G. Harrold Carswell, 72, American judge.
- Heinrich Eberbach, 96, German general during World War II.
- Christopher Ironside, 79, English painter and coin designer.
- Vince Scott, 67, Canadian football player.
- Cicely Williams, 98, Jamaican physician.
- Alex Wojciechowicz, 76, American football player (Detroit Lions, Philadelphia Eagles).

=== 14 ===
- Barbara Comyns, 84, English writer and artist.
- Thomas Hicks, 74, American bobsledder and Olympic medalist (1948).
- Ikhtiyar Kasimov, 22, Azerbaijani soldier and war hero, killed in action.
- Slavko Luštica, 69, Yugoslav football player and Olympian (1952).
- Danny McShain, 79, American professional wrestler.
- Yılmaz Şen, 49, Turkish football player.
- Willie Wynn, 74, American baseball player.

=== 15 ===
- Jim Buntine, 90, Australian Chief Commissioner of Girl Guides (1962–1968).
- Hammer DeRoburt, 69, Nauruan politician, president (1968–1976, 1978–1989), diabetes.
- Ernestine Eckstein, 51, American LGBT activist.
- Enrico Garzelli, 82, Italian rower and Olympic medalist (1932, 1936).
- Johnny Martin, 60, Australian cricket player.
- Marianne Simson, 71, German dancer and film actress.

=== 16 ===
- Buck Buchanan, 51, American Hall of Fame gridiron football player (Kansas City Chiefs), lung cancer.
- Seien Kin, 78, Korean Olympic speed skater (1936).
- Tatyana Pelttser, 88, Russian actress.
- Philip Sankey, Malaysian Olympic field hockey player (1956).
- Jack Surtees, 81, English footballer.
- Mai-Mai Sze, 82, Chinese-American writer and painter.

=== 17 ===
- Ingemar Andersson, 64, Swedish sprint canoeist and Olympian (1948, 1952).
- Kanan Devi, 76, Indian actress and singer.
- Johnny Letman, 74, American jazz trumpeter.
- Don R. Pears, 92, American politician.
- Riccardo Pizzocaro, 91, Italian Olympic wrestler (1924).
- Larry Roberts, 65, American voice actor (Lady and the Tramp) and fashion designer, AIDS-related complications.

=== 18 ===
- Pierce Brodkorb, 83, American ornithologist and paleontologist.
- Willa Brown, 86, American aviator.
- Pang Hak-se, 80, North Korean politician.
- Rudolf Ising, 88, American animator (Looney Tunes, Merrie Melodies, Tom and Jerry), cancer.
- Ben Kniest, 64, Dutch Olympic water polo player (1960, 1964).
- Victor Louis, 64, Soviet journalist and disinformation operative, heart attack.
- Giuseppe Paupini, 85, Italian cardinal of the Catholic Church.
- Jan Pelleboer, 68, Dutch meteorologist.
- Laura Rodríguez, 35, Chilean political activist, brain tumor.
- Helmut Schmid, 67, German actor.
- Bob Weatherill, 94, Australian rules footballer.

=== 19 ===
- Paolo Borsellino, 52, Italian magistrate, assassination by car bomb.
- Heinz Galinski, 79, German activist.
- Allen Newell, 65, American computer scientist, cancer.
- Alan E. Nourse, 63, American science fiction writer and physician.
- Bert Peer, 81, Canadian ice hockey player (Detroit Red Wings).

=== 20 ===
- Alec Bonnett, 69, British sports shooter and Olympian (1968).
- John Bratby, 64, English painter, heart attack.
- Ed Goddard, 77, American football player (Brooklyn Dodgers, Cleveland Rams), cancer.
- Bruce Henderson, 78, American businessman and management expert.
- Artem Kopot, 19, Russian ice hockey player, traffic collision.
- Luigi Ruspoli, 84, Italian Olympic sports shooter (1952).
- John Tinsley, 73, British Anglican prelate, Bishop of Bristol (1975–1985).

=== 21 ===
- Mario Boyé, 69, Argentine football player.
- Ravindra Dave, 73, Indian filmmaker.
- Aloys Fleischmann, 82, Irish composer, conductor, and musicologist.
- Rauf Hasağası, 91, Turkish Olympic sprinter (1924).
- Edward Dean Kennedy, 47, American murderer, execution by electrocution.
- Bob Phillips, 75, American basketball player.
- Ernst Schäfer, 82, German explorer, hunter and zoologist.
- Helmut Seibt, 63, Austrian Olympic figure skater (1948, 1952).
- Petar Tanchev, 72, Bulgarian politician.

=== 22 ===
- Reginald Bretnor, 80, American science fiction author.
- Ya'akov Hazan, 93, Israeli politician and social activist.
- Anna Kocková-Kratochvílova, 77, Slovak botanist and microbiologist.
- Wayne McLaren, 51, American actor and stuntman (Marlboro Man), lung cancer.
- John Meyendorff, 66, French-American theologian, pancreatic cancer.
- F. S. C. Northrop, 98, American philosopher.
- Eduard Stayson, 69, Soviet-Russian Olympic sailor (1960).
- K. N. Udupa, 72, Indian surgeon and academic.
- David Wojnarowicz, 37, American photographer, filmmaker, and painter, AIDS.

=== 23 ===
- Arletty, 94, French actress.
- Maxine Audley, 69, English actress.
- Tord Bernheim, 78, Swedish singer, actor, and revue performer.
- Suleiman Frangieh, 82, Lebanese politician, president (1970–1976), pneumonia.
- Robert Liddell, 83, English literary critic, biographer, novelist, travel writer and poet.
- Dmitry Maevsky, 75, Soviet and Russian painter.
- Eugene Murdock, 71, American baseball historian.
- Ian Proctor, 74, British sailboat designer.
- Bill Striegel, 56, American gridiron football player (Philadelphia Eagles, Oakland Raiders, Boston Patriots).
- Rosemary Sutcliff, 71, English novelist.

=== 24 ===
- Sam Berger, 92, Canadian sports executive.
- Serge de Gastyne, 61, American composer and pianist.
- Gavriil Ilizarov, 71, Russian physician, heart failure.
- Ernie Quinn, 66, Australian politician.

=== 25 ===
- Ralph P. Boas, Jr., 79, American mathematician and journal editor.
- Gunārs Cilinskis, 61, Latvian actor and filmmaker, heart attack.
- Alfred Drake, 77, American actor, cancer.
- Pola Nireńska, 81, Polish modern dancer, suicide.
- Vittorio Sanipoli, 76, Italian actor.
- Gary Windo, 50, English jazz tenor saxophonist, asthma.

=== 26 ===
- Rita Atria, 17, Italian antimafia collaborator, suicide.
- Franc Gartner, 87, Yugoslavian Olympic cyclist (1936).
- Tzeni Karezi, 60, Greek film and stage actress, cancer.
- Janet Key, 47, English actress, cancer.
- Ottorino Quaglierini, 77, Italian rower and Olympic medalist (1936).
- Richard D. Remington, 60, American academic.
- Elga Olga Svendsen, 86, Danish film actress and singer.
- Mary Wells, 49, American singer, laryngeal cancer.
- Yasuharu Ōyama, 69, Japanese shogi player.

=== 27 ===
- Max Dupain, 81, Australian photographer.
- Amjad Khan, 51, Indian actor and film director, heart failure.
- Salty Parker, 80, American baseball player (Detroit Tigers), coach and manager.
- Anthony Salerno, 80, American mobster and Genovese crime family boss, stroke.
- Nat Silcock, Jr., 64, English rugby player and coach.
- Ferdinand Wenauer, 53, German football player, heart failure.

=== 28 ===
- Ron Daws, 55, American Olympic runner (1968), heart attack.
- Seidou Njimoluh Njoya, 90, Cameroonian sultan.
- Sulev Nõmmik, 61, Estonian actor, comedian, and theatre and movie director.
- Jovan Rašković, 63, Croatian Serb psychiatrist, academic and politician, heart attack.
- Lester Shorr, 85, American cinematographer.

=== 29 ===
- Lucia Demetrius, 82, Romanian novelist, poet, and playwright.
- Marcel Janssens, 60, Belgian cyclist.
- Kemal Kayacan, 77, Turkish admiral, murdered.
- Michel Larocque, 40, Canadian ice hockey player, brain cancer.
- William Mathias, 57, Welsh composer.
- Dominik Smole, 62, Slovenian playwright.
- Dmitry Zubarev, 74, Russian theoretical physicist.

=== 30 ===
- Nils Boe, 78, American attorney and politician.
- Paul Gapp, 64, American journalist and Pulitzer Prize winner, lung cancer.
- Tonin Harapi, 64, Albanian composer and teacher.
- Bo Lindman, 93, Swedish modern pentathlete and Olympic champion (1924, 1928, 1932).
- Brenda Marshall, 76, American actress, throat cancer.
- Ken Myer, 71, American-Australian businessman, diplomat, and philanthropist.
- George Novack, 86, American Marxist theoretician, and activist.
- Miguel Passi, 69, Argentine Olympic cyclist (1948).
- Joe Shuster, 78, Canadian-American comic artist, co-creator of Superman, heart failure.

=== 31 ===
- Anvar Alikhanov, 75, Soviet politician and apparatchik.
- Leonard Cheshire, 74, English RAF officer and philanthropist, motor neurone disease.
- Uzi Peres, 41, Israeli film director, plane crash.
- Ralph Strait, 56, American actor (The Beastmaster, Halloween III: Season of the Witch, Search for Tomorrow), heart attack.
