= Kratochvil =

Kratochvil (feminine form: Kratochvilová) is a Czech and Slovak surname, a variant of Kratochvíl. Notable people with the surname include:

- Jiří Kratochvil, Czech writer
- Michel Kratochvil, Swiss tennis player

== See also ==
- Kratochwil and Kratochwill, German spellings of the same surname
