= List of international presidential trips made by Sadyr Japarov =

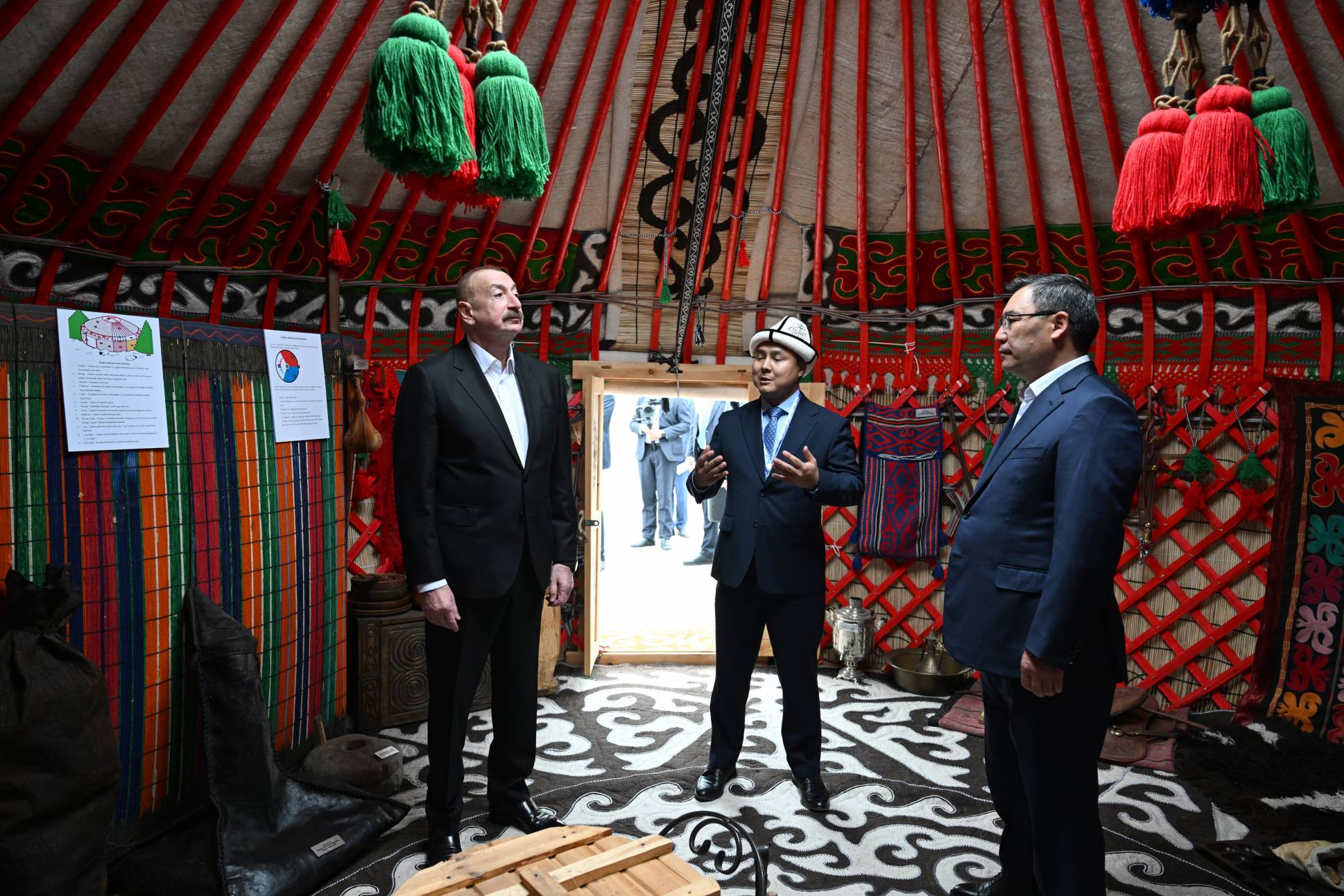
President of Azerbaijan Ilham Aliyev and president of Kyrgyzstan Sadyr Japarov during the opening of Xıdırlı, Agdam.

This is a list of presidential trips made by Sadyr Japarov, the 6th President of the Kyrgyz Republic.

== 2021 ==
Country	Dates	Host	Notes
Russia	25–26 February	President Vladimir Putin	Official visit. Met with Tatar President Rustam Minnikhanov.
Kazakhstan	2–3 March	President Kassym-Jomart Tokayev	Official visit.
Uzbekistan	11–12 March	President Shavkat Mirziyoyev	Official visit. Visited the Innovative Technopark "Yashnabad" in Tashkent.
Russia	24 May	President Vladimir Putin	Working visit.
Turkey	9-11 June	President Recep Tayyip Erdoğan	Official visit.
Turkmenistan	27-28 June	President Gurbanguly Berdimuhamedow	Official visit.
Tajikistan	28-29 June	President Emomali Rahmon	Official visit.
Turkmenistan	5-6 August	President Gurbanguly Berdimuhamedow	Working visit.

== 2022 ==
Country	Dates	Host	Notes
Azerbaijan	19 May	President Ilham Aliyev	State visit.
Russia	16 May	President Vladimir Putin	Working visit.
UAE	17 May	President Muhammad bin Zayed Al Nahayan	Working visit.
Uzbekistan	14-16 September	President Shavkat Mirziyoyev	Working visit.
Kazakhstan	27 October	President Kassym-Jomart Tokayev	Working visit.
UAE	30 October-1 November	President Muhammad bin Zayed Al Nahayan	Working visit.
Qatar	19 December	Emir Sheikh Tamim bin Hamad Al Thani	Working visit.

== 2023 ==
Country	Dates	Host	Notes
Hungary	13 February	President Katalin Novak	Working visit.
Turkey	16-17 March	President Recep Tayyip Erdoğan	Working visit.
Russia	8-9 May	President Vladimir Putin	Working visit.
China	May 18	President Xi Jinping	State visit.
Turkey	3 June	President Recep Tayyip Erdoğan	Working visit.
Mongolia	9-11 July	President Ukhnaagiin Khürelsükh	State visit.
Kazakhstan	November 9–10	President Kassym-Jomart Tokayev	Working visit.
Belarus	November 23–24	President Alexander Lukashenko	Working visit. Attended the Collective Security Treaty Organization summit in Minsk.
UAE	December 1–3	President Mohamed bin Zayed Al Nahyan	Working visit.
Russia	26 December	President Vladimir Putin	Working visit.

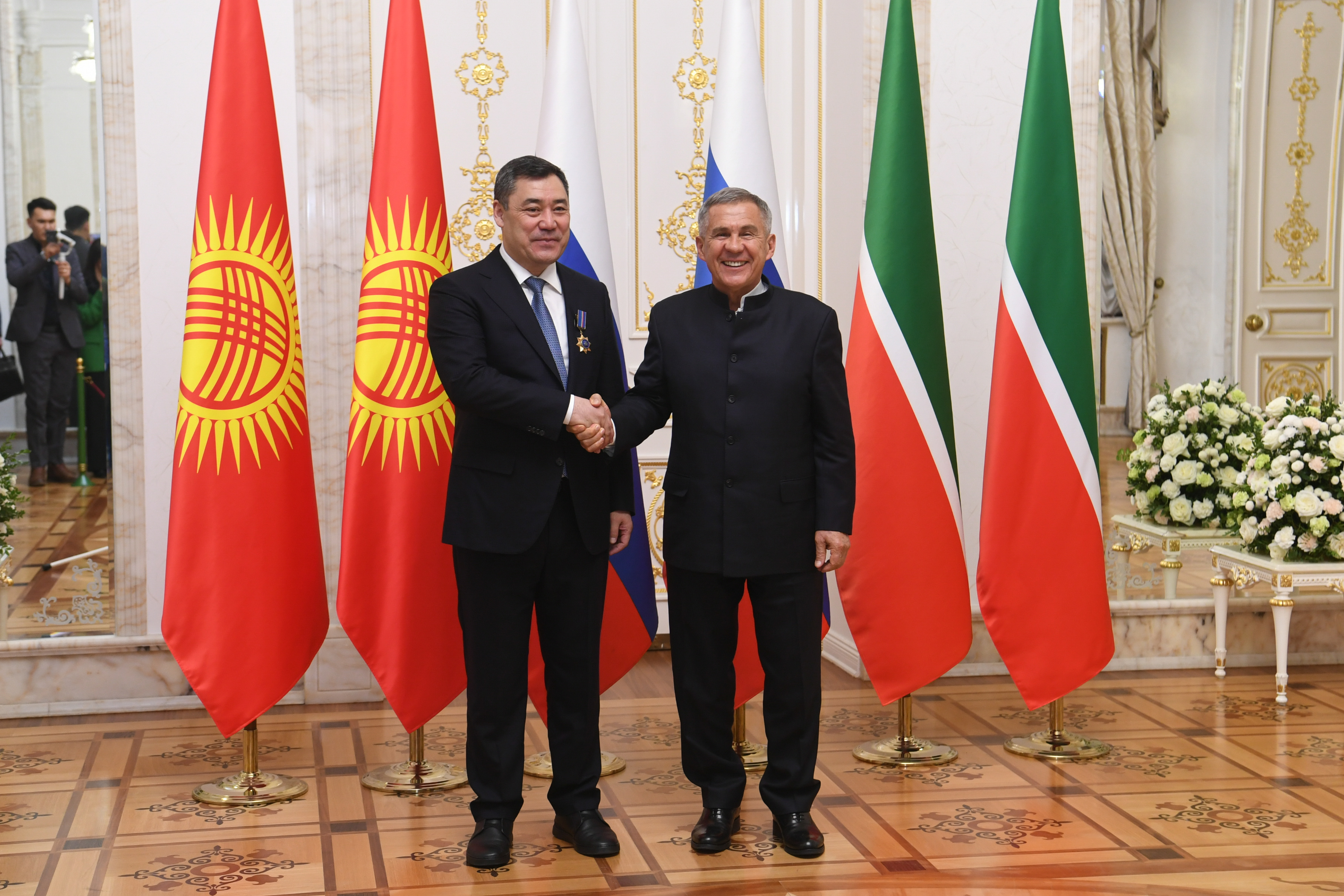
Rustam Minnikhanov and Sadyr Japarov in June 2024.

== 2024 ==
Country	Dates	Host	Notes
UAE	12-13 February	President Mohamed bin Zayed Al Nahyan	Working visit.
Russia	21 February	Rais Rustam Minnikhanov	Working visit.
Kazakhstan	18-19 April	President Kassym-Jomart Tokayev	State visit.
Azerbaijan	24 April	President Ilham Aliyev	Official visit.
Russia	9 May	President Vladimir Putin	Attended Victory Day parade.
Belgium	24-26 June	King Philippe of Belgium	Working visit.
Kazakhstan	3-4 July	President Kassym-Jomart Tokayev	Working visit.
Kazakhstan	17 September	President Kassym-Jomart Tokayev	Working visit.
USA	21–24 September	President Donald Trump	Attended UNGA 79th session.
Italy	3 October	President Sergio Mattarella	State visit.
Vatican City	3 October	Pope Francis	State visit.
Turkmenistan	11 October	President Serdar Berdimuhamedow	Working visit.
Saudi Arabia	10 November	Crown Prince Mohammed bin Salman	Working visit.
Azerbaijan	11 November	President Ilham Aliyev	COP29
Austria	25–26 November	President Alexander Van der Bellen	Official visit.
Germany	26-27 November	President Frank-Walter Steinmeier	Official visit.
South Korea	2–3 December	President Yoon Suk Yeol	Official visit.

== 2025 ==
Country	Dates	Host	Notes
China	4–5 February	President Xi Jinping	State visit.
Bahrain	21-22 April	King Hamad bin Isa Al Khalifa	First official visit to Bahrain.
Russia	9 May	President Vladimir Putin	Attended Victory Day parade.
Hungary	20-21 May	Prime Minister Viktor Orbán	Organization of Turkic States summit.
Kazakhstan	30 May	President Kassym-Jomart Tokayev	Attended the Astana Italy-Central Asia Summit.
Kazakhstan	17 June	President Kassym-Jomart Tokayev	Attended the Astana 2nd China–Central Asia Summit.
Malaysia	24–25 June	Prime Minister Anwar Ibrahim	First presidential visit to Malaysia in 30 years.
Belarus	26 June	President Alexander Lukashenko	Working visit for Supreme Eurasian Economic Council and Eurasian Economic Forum.
Russia	3 July	President Vladimir Putin	Working visit.
Azerbaijan	3-4 July	President Ilham Aliyev	Working visit.
Tajikistan	8-9 July	President Emomali Rahmon	Official visit.
China	31 August - 3 September 2025	President Xi Jinping	Working visit for participation in 2025 Tianjin Shanghai Cooperation Organization summit and participation in Beijing 80th victory day parade.
USA	22-24 September	President Donald Trump	Participation in 80th United Nations General Assembly
Azerbaijan	7 October	President Ilham Aliyev	Participation in 2025 summit of Organization of Turkic States in Qabala
Tajikistan	8–10 October	President Emomali Rahmon	Attended the 2025 CIS Summit.
Egypt	3-4 November	President Abdel Fattah el-Sisi	State visit.
USA	6-7 November	President Donald Trump	Working visit
Pakistan	3-4 December	Prime Minister Shehbaz Sharif	First Kyrgyz President to visit Pakistan since 2005.
Turkmenistan	11–12 December	President Serdar Berdimuhamedow	Attended "International Year of Peace and Trust forum" an international forum held to mark the 30th anniversary of Turkmenistan's permanent neutrality.
Japan	December 18	Prime Minister Sanae Takaichi	Working visit.
Russia	20-21 December	President Vladimir Putin	Working visit.

== 2026 ==
Country	Dates	Host	Notes
Kazakhstan	21–22 April	President Kassym-Jomart Tokayev	Regional Environmental Summit (RES).
Russia	23 April	President Vladimir Putin	Working visit.
Kazakhstan	15 May	President Kassym-Jomart Tokayev	Organization of Turkic States summit.
Azerbaijan	17–18 May	President Ilham Aliyev	13th session of the World Urban Forum (WUF13).
Kazakhstan	28–29 May	President Kassym-Jomart Tokayev	Attended the summit of the Eurasian Economic Union in Astana.
Kazakhstan	29 July	President Kassym-Jomart Tokayev	Games of the Future opening ceremony.
South Korea	15–18 September	President Lee Jae Myung	Official visit. Attended the 1st Korea-Central Asia Summit in Seoul.
United States	18–23 September	President Donald Trump	Visited Salt Lake City after being invited by Utah's Senate member Stuart Adams. Made an unexpected side visit to Niagara Falls where he went on the Maid of the Mist and dined at the Top of the Falls restaurant. Attended the 81th United Nations General Assembly.
Turkmenistan	8–9 October	President Serdar Berdimuhamedow	Attended the CIS summit.
Azerbaijan	14–15 October	President Ilham Aliyev	Attended the CICA summit.
Armenia	15–17 October	Prime Minister Nikol Pashinyan	Official visit. Attended the 17th meeting of the COP 17 for Biodiversity (CBD).
Turkey	29–30 October	President Recep Tayyip Erdoğan	Attended the 13th OTS summit.
Russia	10–11 November	President Vladimir Putin	Attended the CSTO summit.

== Future visits ==
Country	Areas visited	Date(s)	Notes
Russia	Saint Petersburg	21 December	Japarov is plan to attend the EAEU summit and informal CIS summit.
