= Hikmat Muradov =

National Hero of Azerbaijan

- Hikmət Oqtay oğlu Muradov
- Born: January 23, 1969; Baku, Azerbaijan SSR
- Died: October 29, 1991 (aged 22); Xanabad, Khojaly, Azerbaijan
- Military career
- Allegiance: Azerbaijan
- Branch: Azerbaijani Air and Air Defence Force
- Service years: 1991
- Conflicts: First Nagorno-Karabakh War
- Awards: National Hero of Azerbaijan; 1992

Hikmat Oktay oghlu Muradov (Azerbaijani: Hikmət Oqtay oğlu Muradov) (23 January 1969 in Baku, Azerbaijan SSR – 29 October 1991 in Xanabad, Khojaly, Azerbaijan) was the National Hero of Azerbaijan and warrior during the First Nagorno-Karabakh War.

== Early life and education ==
Muradov was born on 23 January 1969 in Baku, Azerbaijan SSR. From 1976 to 1986 he studied at the secondary school No. 190. That year he entered the Krasnokustk Civil Aviation School. After graduating in 1991 he was appointed a II pilot in An-2 plane in Yevlakh Aviation Company.

=== Family ===
Muradov was single.

== Nagorno Karabakh war ==
When the First Nagorno-Karabakh War started, Muradov was assigned to the front line. Muradov carried out many flights to Nagorno-Karakabh with his AN-2 plane. He transported equipment, food and ammunition to Azerbaijani soldiers in Khojaly. On October 29, 1991, an AN-2 aircraft operated by Muradov was shot down by Armenian soldiers in Khanabad village of Khojali region returning from Khojali. As a result, the entire crew and all passengers on the plane were tragically killed.

== Honors ==
Hikmat Oktay oghlu Muradov was posthumously awarded the title of the "National Hero of Azerbaijan" by Presidential Decree No. 337 dated 25 November 1992.

He was buried at a Martyrs' Lane cemetery in Baku.

== See also ==
- First Nagorno-Karabakh War
- List of National Heroes of Azerbaijan
- Azerbaijani Air and Air Defence Force
- 1992 Azerbaijani Mil Mi-8 shootdown

== Sources ==
- Vüqar Əsgərov. "Azərbaycanın Milli Qəhrəmanları" (Yenidən işlənmiş II nəşr). Bakı: "Dərələyəz-M", 2010, səh. 214.
