= Kratochvíl =

Kratochvíl (feminine form: Kratochvílová) is a Czech and Slovak surname. Variant without diacritic: Kratochvil. Notable people with the surname include:

- Anna Kocková-Kratochvílova (1915–1992), Slovak botanist and microbiologist
- David Kratochvíl (born 2007), Czech Paralympic swimmer
- Jan Kratochvíl (born 1959), Czech mathematician
- Gabriela Kratochvílová (born 1990), Czech model
- Jarmila Kratochvílová (born 1951), Czech 400 m runner
- Martin Kratochvíl (born 1946), Czech jazz musician
- Michel Kratochvil (born 1979), Swiss tennis player
- Karel Kratochvíl (born 1982), Czech footballer
- Lukáš Kratochvíl (born 2005), Czech slalom canoeist
- Miloš Kratochvíl (born 1996), Czech footballer
- Monika Kratochvílová (born 1974), Czech tennis player
- Roman Kratochvíl (born 1974), Slovak footballer
- Tomáš Kratochvíl (born 1971), Czech race walker

== See also ==
- Kratochwil and Kratochwill, German spellings of the same surname
