= Siegfried L. Kratochwil =

Austrian painter and poet

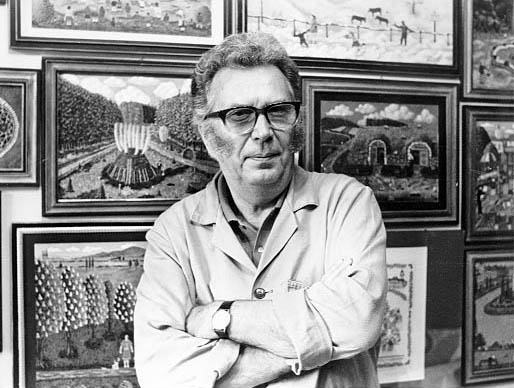
- Kratochwil in his Atelier 1988
- Born: Siegfried Leopold Kratochwil; March 24, 1916; Vienna, Austria
- Died: March 25, 2005 (aged 89); Vienna
- Known for: Art, Poetry
- Movement: Naïve art, Primitivism

Siegfried Leopold Kratochwil (March 24, 1916 – February 25, 2005) was an Austrian painter and poet. Born in Karlstift, Lower Austria, he later moved to Vienna and became one of the best-known Austrian Naïve artists by the end of the 20th century.

== Background ==
Siegfried L. Kratochwil was born in the small logging village of Karlstift in Lower Austria. After enrolling in a trade school in Vienna, he became a technician and tool maker. The Second World War was a very hard time for Kratochwil and he was forced to try his hand at various professions. He married in 1939 and the initial years of marriage took place during the war. His ill health kept him from military duty.

Kratochwil began helping his daughter with drawings and paintings, after she was born in 1941. It soon became apparent to him that painting made him happy. A passion for painting thus blossomed, one that would span almost 50 years, focusing primarily on Viennese motifs, which were, in turn, rooted in deeper themes of Austrian culture and history. Kratochwil also spent a significant amount of time writing poetry and etching copper engravings. Each of his paintings were usually accompanied by a poem.

Kratochwil had always considered Austria his home, which is why his country and his lifelong experiences there were so central to his artwork. He was buried in Vienna in 2005 at the age of 89.

== Exhibitions and Museums ==
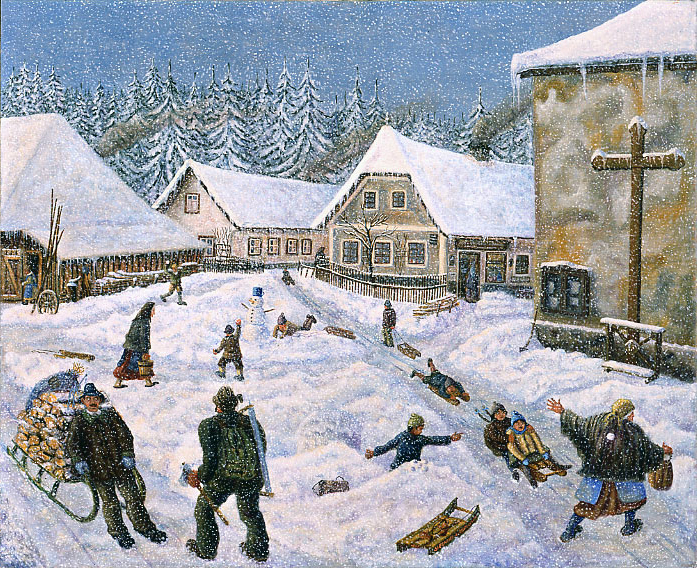
Winter in Karlstift

Aside from the many cities in Austria, his exhibitions have spanned the continents of Europe and North America. Much of his work is currently held in private collections and museums. The following museums contain some of Kratochwil's artwork:

- Historical Museum of the City of Vienna, Austria
- Clemens-Sels-Museum, Neuss, Germany
- Vestisches Museum, Recklinghausen, Germany
- Museum for German Ethnic Studies, Berlin, Germany
- Museum Rade, Hamburg, Germany
- German Bread Museum, Ulm, Germany
- Centraal Museum, Utrecht, Netherlands
- Museum of Naïve Art L'ile de France, Paris, France
- Musée international d'Art naïf Anatole Jakovsky, Nice, France
- Lower Austrian Regional Museum, Vienna, Austria
- Robert-Stolz Museum, Vienna, Austria
- Musée d'Art Naïf - Max Fourny

== Gallery ==
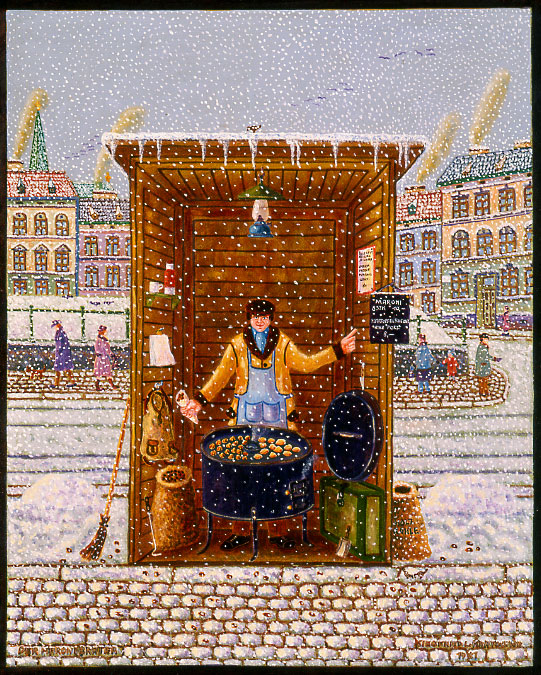
The Chestnut Vendor, Vienna

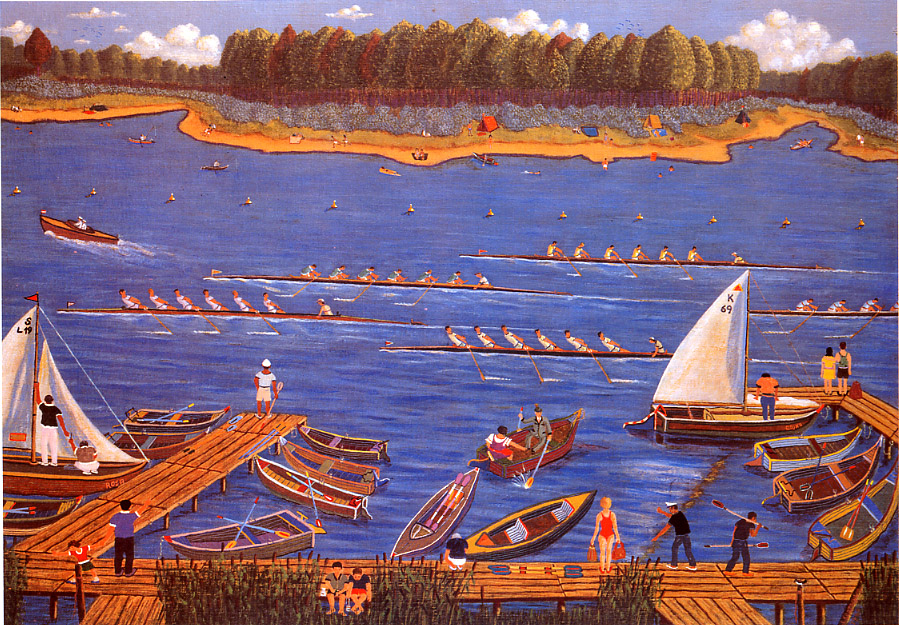
Frankfurt, Germany

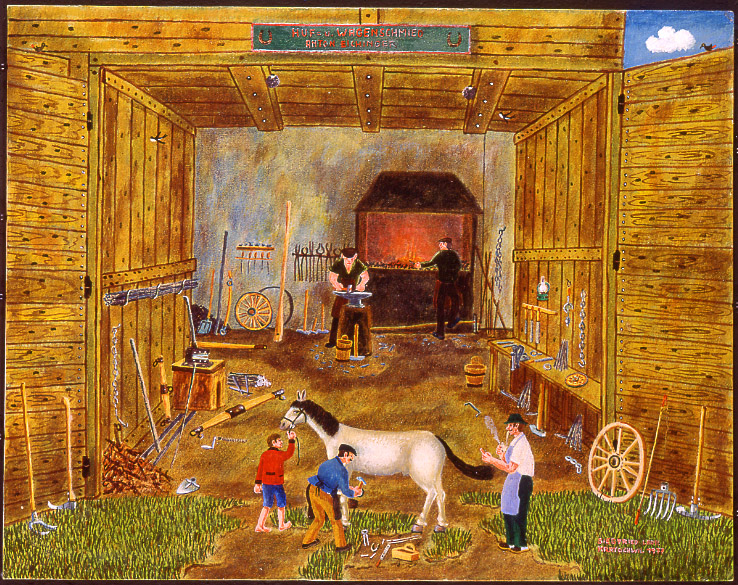
The Horseshoe Maker, Karlstift, Lower Austria

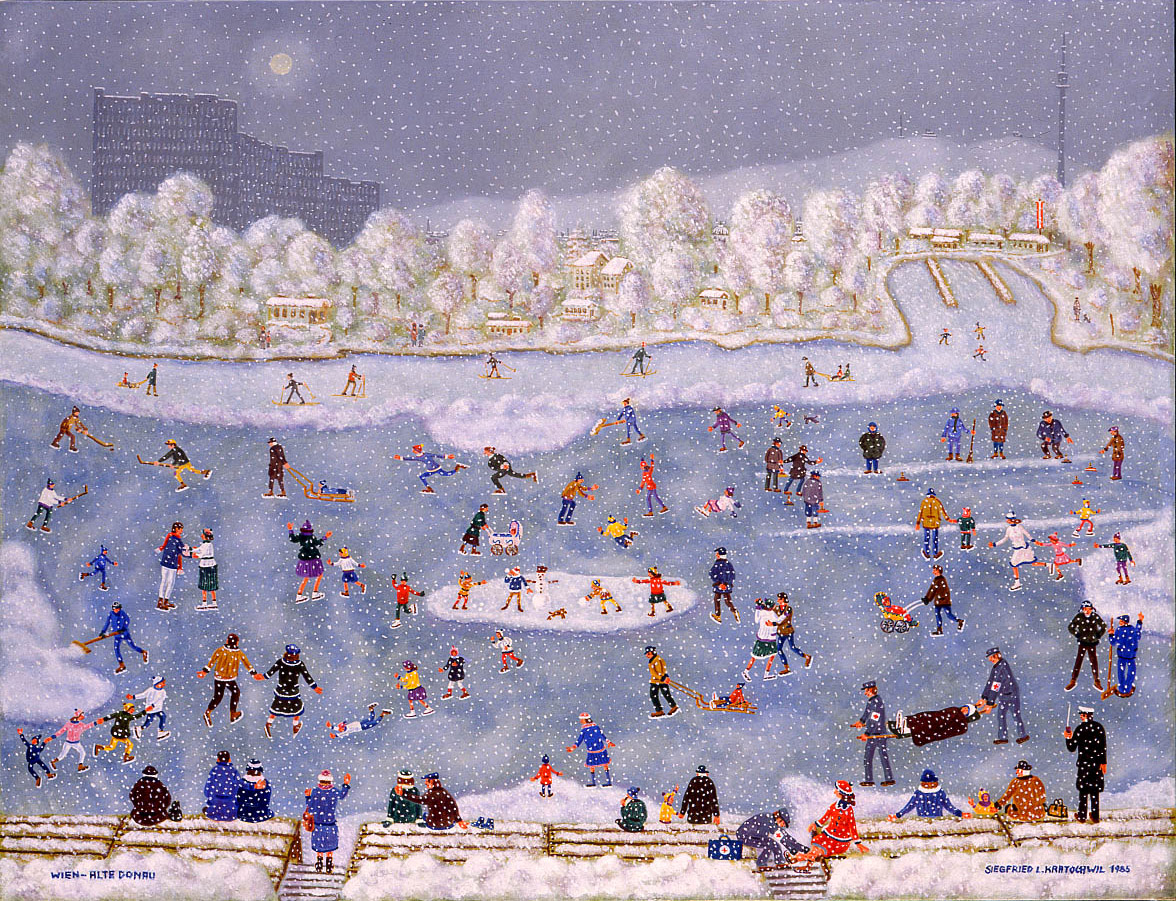
The Danube, Vienna

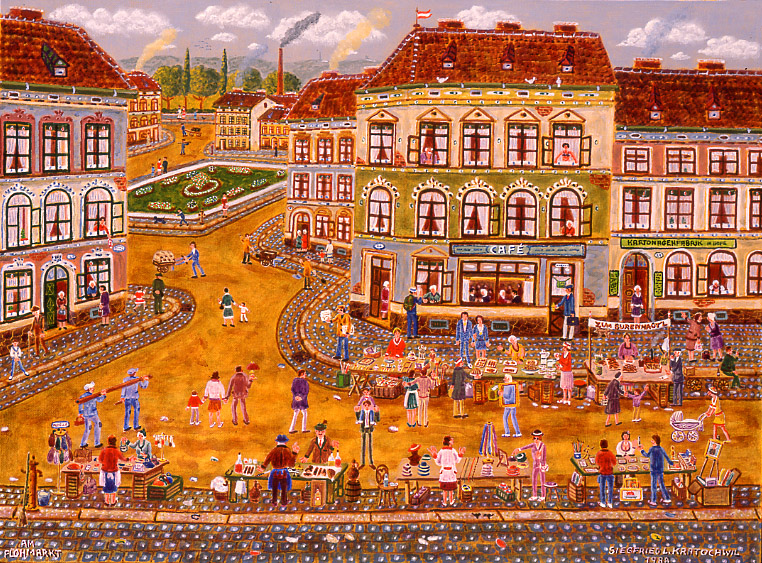
The Fleamarket, Vienna

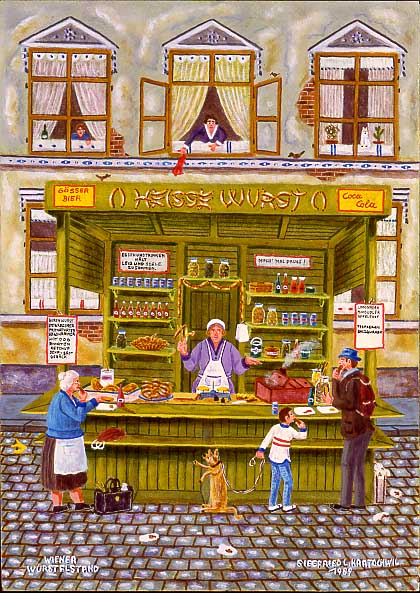
The Sausage Stand, Vienna

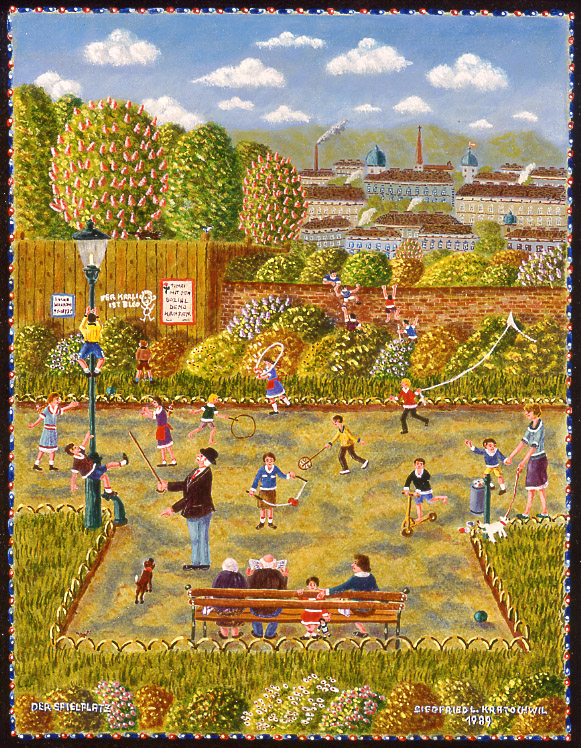
The Playground, Vienna

== See also ==
- Naïve Art
- Folk Art
- Outsider Art
- Anatole Jakovsky

== References and sources ==
Sources

- Der Plumpsack geht um. Alte und neue Kinderspiele (Rowohlt Taschenbuch Publishing 1979) ISBN 3-499-20217-4
- Alt-Wien: die Stadt, die niemals war. Wolfgang Kos, Christian Rapp, Czernin Verlag 2004. ISBN 978-3-7076-0193-0
