= Kratochwill =

Kratochwill is the German spelling of the Czech/Slovak surname Kratochvíl. Notable people with the surname include:

- Thomas R. Kratochwill (born 1946), American academic
- Magdalene Kratochwill or Madeleine Nottes (1823–1861), Austrian opera and chamber prima donna

== See also ==
- Kratochwil, alternative spelling
