= Kratochwil =

Kratochwil is the German spelling of the Czech/Slovak surname Kratochvíl. Notable people with the surname include:

- Friedrich Kratochwil (born 1944), German professor of political studies and political writer
- Heinz Kratochwil (1933–1995), Austrian composer and music teacher
- Maria Antonina Kratochwil (1881–1942), one of the 108 Martyrs of World War II
- Siegfried L. Kratochwil (1916–2005), Austrian painter and poet
- Veronika Kratochwil (born 1988), Austrian diver
- Fynn Kratochwil (born 2010), German motorcycle racer

== See also ==
- Kratochwill, alternative spelling
