= Bakhsheyis Pashayev =

Azerbaijani soldier

- Born: May 1, 1936; Əhmədavar, Agdam District Azerbaijan
- Died: July 12, 1992 (aged 56); Xanabad, Khojaly District, Azerbaijan
- Military career
- Allegiance: Republic of Azerbaijan
- Service years: 1991–1992
- Conflicts: First Nagorno-Karabakh War
- Awards: National Hero of Azerbaijan; 1992

Bakhsheyis Khanahmad oglu Pashayev (Azerbaijani: Baxşeyiş Paşayev; 1 May 1936 in Agdam District, Azerbaijan – 12 July 1992 in Xanabad, Khojaly, Azerbaijan) was a recipient of the National Hero of Azerbaijan who fought in the First Nagorno-Karabakh War.

== Early life and education ==
Bakhsheish Pashayev was born in Ahmadavar village of Agdam District on 1 May 1939. After graduating from the village school, he went to Technical College of Agriculture. In 1988, after complicating the situation in Karabakh, as well as the assassination of Ali and Bakhtiar, he joined the ranks of the National Movement.

== First Nagorno-Karabakh War ==
Bakhsheish, who connected his life with the frontline, brought weapons and equipment to the servicemen, risked his life for the safety of civilians. He was one of the most active members of the "Karabakh defense falcons" group. He distinguished himself during the cleaning of the village of Khramort from the Armenian Armed Forces. Being a professional shooter, Bakhsheish, who was called "Aksakal", participated in several battles. Not once went to the exploration in the village of Khanabad, Nakhchivanly, Aranzemin. During the Khojaly tragedy in 1992, he saved dozens of civilians. On November 15, 1991, Pashayev was killed in a fight when the Armenian soldiers attacked the village of Khanabad with large forces.

== Honors ==
By Decree of the President of Azerbaijan No. 350 dated December 7, 1992 Bakhsheish Pashayev was posthumously awarded the title of the "National Hero of Azerbaijan". He was buried at a cemetery in Aghdam.

== See also ==
- First Nagorno-Karabakh War
- National Hero of Azerbaijan

== Sources ==
- Vugar Asgarov. Azərbaycanın Milli Qəhrəmanları (Yenidən işlənmiş II nəşr). Bakı: "Dərələyəz-M", 2010, səh. 237.
