= Hidayat Rustamov =

National Hero of Azerbaijan

- Hidayət Rüstəmov
- Born: 19 August 1970; Khydyrly, Agdam, Azerbaijan SSR, USSR
- Died: 23 December 1991 (aged 21); Shusha, Azerbaijan
- Military career
- Allegiance: Azerbaijan
- Branch: Azerbaijani Armed Forces
- Service years: 1991
- Conflicts: First Nagorno-Karabakh War
- Awards: National Hero of Azerbaijan; 1992

Hidayat Eldar oglu Rustamov (Azerbaijani: Rüstəmov Hidayət Eldar oğlu; 19 August 1970, Khydyrly, Agdam, Azerbaijan SSR, USSR – 23 December 1991, Shusha, Azerbaijan) was the National Hero of Azerbaijan and warrior during the First Nagorno-Karabakh War.

== Early life and education ==
Rustamov was born on 19 August 1970 in Xıdırlı village of Agdam raion of Azerbaijan SSR. After graduating from the secondary school in Xıdırlı village, he continued his education at Agdam Vocational School No. 50. From 1988 through 1990, Rustamov served in the Soviet Armed Forces. In 1991 he entered the Police Regiment of Agdam District Department of Internal Affairs.

Rustamov was single.

== First Nagorno-Karabakh war ==
Rustamov joined the ranks of Azerbaijani Armed Forces as a volunteer in 1991. On 23 December 1991, he died in a battle around the Meşəli village of Shusha District of Azerbaijan.

== Honors ==
Hidayat Eldar oglu Rustamov was posthumously awarded the title of the "National Hero of Azerbaijan" under Presidential Decree No. 264 dated 8 October 1992.

Rustamov was buried at Martyrs' Lane cemetery in Agdam District.

== See also ==
- First Nagorno-Karabakh War
- List of National Heroes of Azerbaijan
