= Xıdırlı, Agdam =

Village in Agdam District, Azerbaijan

Khidirli
- Azerbaijani: Xıdırlı
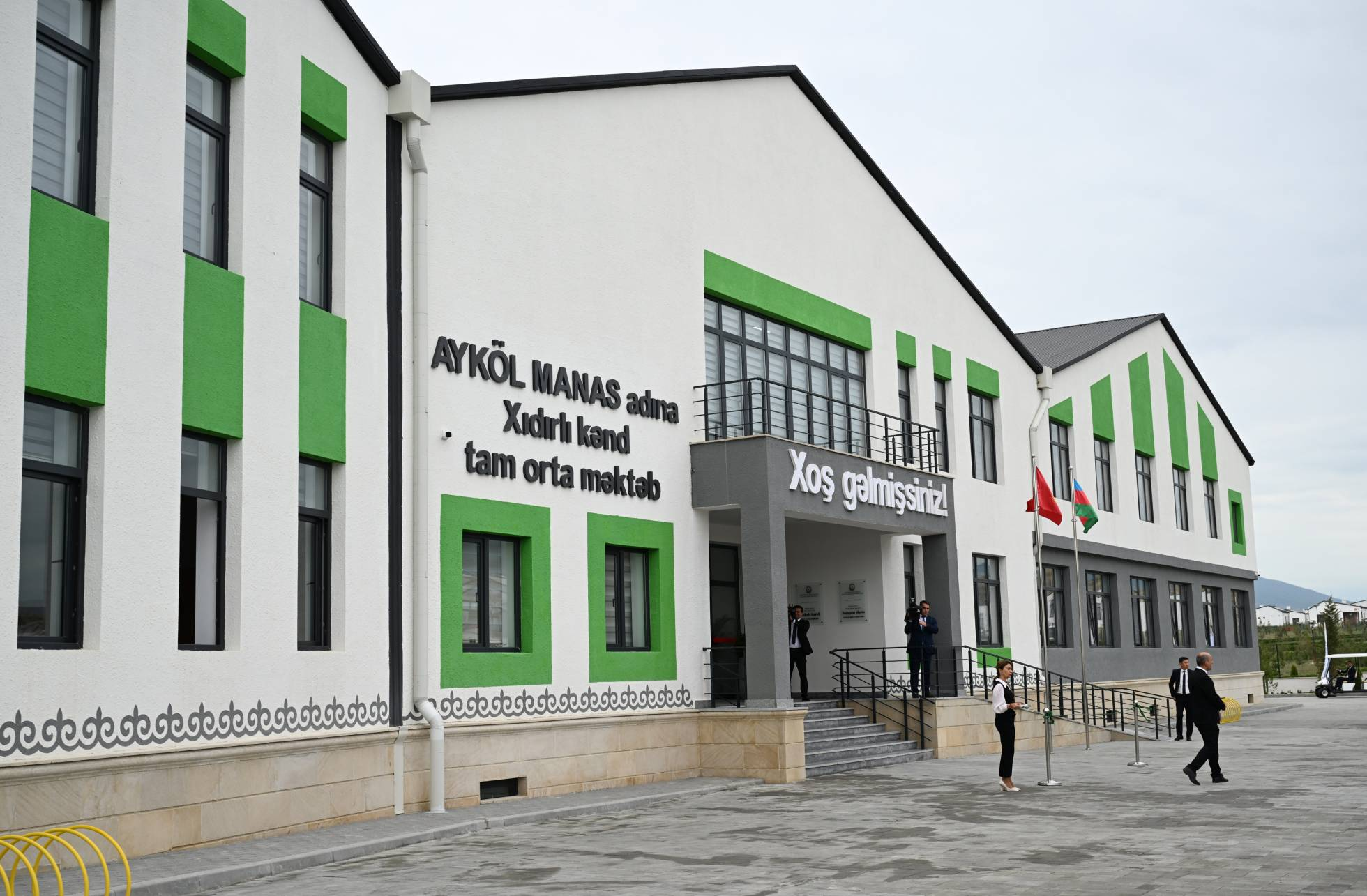

- Location within Azerbaijan Location within Karabakh Economic Region
- Coordinates: 40°00′56″N 46°53′26″E
- Country: Azerbaijan
- District: Agdam

Population (2025)
  - Total: 737
- Time zone: UTC+4 (AZT)
- Postal code: AZ0228

Khidirli (Azerbaijani: Xıdırlı; also romanized as Khydyrly) is a village in the Agdam District of Azerbaijan. It serves as the administrative centre of the Khidirli rural administrative unit, which also includes the villages of Chukhurmahla and Ahmadavar.

== Geography ==
Khidirli lies about 3 km north-west of the city of Aghdam. The village is situated at the foothills of the Karabakh Range.

== Etymology ==
The name Xıdırlı is an ethnotoponym. The settlement is described as having formed in the mid-19th century following the relocation of the xıdırlı tribe from the Javad uezd.

== History ==
=== Soviet period ===
In the late Soviet period, Khidirli functioned as the centre of a village council in Agdam District of the Azerbaijan SSR. Contemporary reference works describe the local economy as based on viticulture, grain-growing, animal husbandry, sericulture and poultry farming, and note the presence of schools, libraries, a club, a medical point and a post/communications office.

=== Karabakh conflict ===
During the First Nagorno-Karabakh war, fighting took place in the Agdam area, and in 1993 the village came under the control of Armenian forces. In that period it was administered de facto as part of the self-proclaimed Republic of Artsakh (as part of its Askeran Province) and was referred to in Armenian as Խդրլը. Following the 2020 Nagorno-Karabakh war and the 2020 Nagorno-Karabakh ceasefire agreement, Agdam District returned to Azerbaijani control on 20 November 2020.

=== Reconstruction and resettlement ===
Post-war reconstruction of Khidirli began with a groundbreaking ceremony on 4 October 2022 attended by President Ilham Aliyev and First Lady Mehriban Aliyeva.

On 25 April 2024, Presidents Ilham Aliyev and Sadyr Japarov took part in the groundbreaking ceremony for a secondary school in the village. The school was built with Kyrgyz support and was named after the Kyrgyz epic figure Aykol Manas; a yurt was installed in the schoolyard as part of the project's cultural presentation.

According to official information released for the opening of the first phase on 3 July 2025, the planned territory of the village exceeds 417 hectares and the master plan provides construction of 1,498 private houses; the first phase covered 170.44 hectares and included 719 houses, alongside public and service facilities such as a multifunctional administrative building, a club–community centre, medical and emergency facilities, a guest house, workshops, a kindergarten and the 528-seat school. The opening of the first phase was attended by Presidents Ilham Aliyev and Sadyr Japarov.

Resettlement of former internally displaced residents was reported in several stages in July 2025. By 31 July 2025, Azerbaijani media reported that a total of 188 families (737 people) had been resettled in the village. (In later reporting, additional relocations in the area were also announced for November 2025.)

== Demographics ==
In the Soviet period, the village's population was reported as 2,478 in 1986. By late July 2025, resettlement reporting stated that 188 families (737 people) had moved into newly built housing in the reconstructed village.

== Notable natives ==
- Hidayat Rustamov — National Hero of Azerbaijan.

== Gallery ==
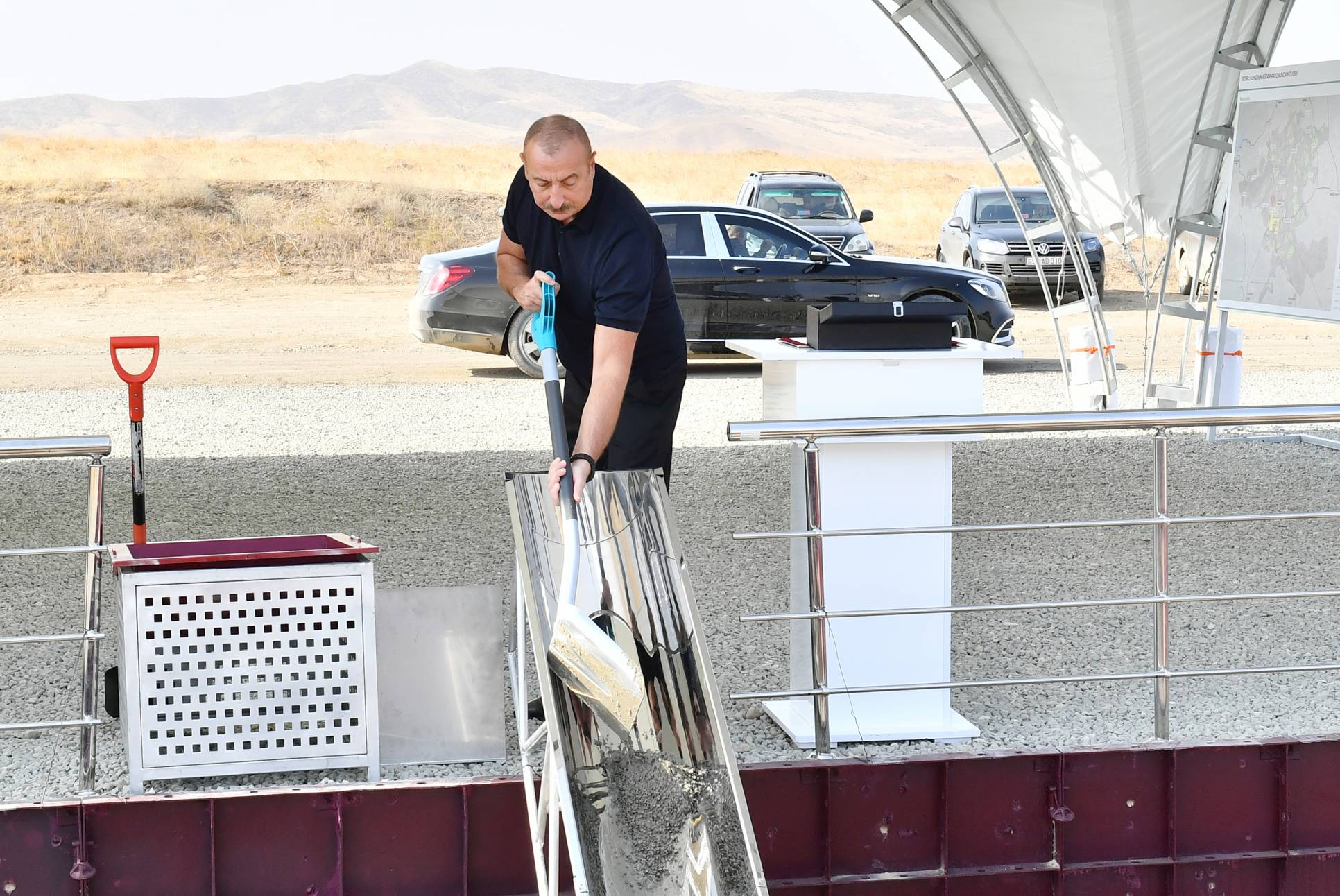
Ilham Aliyev attending groundbreaking ceremony for the village

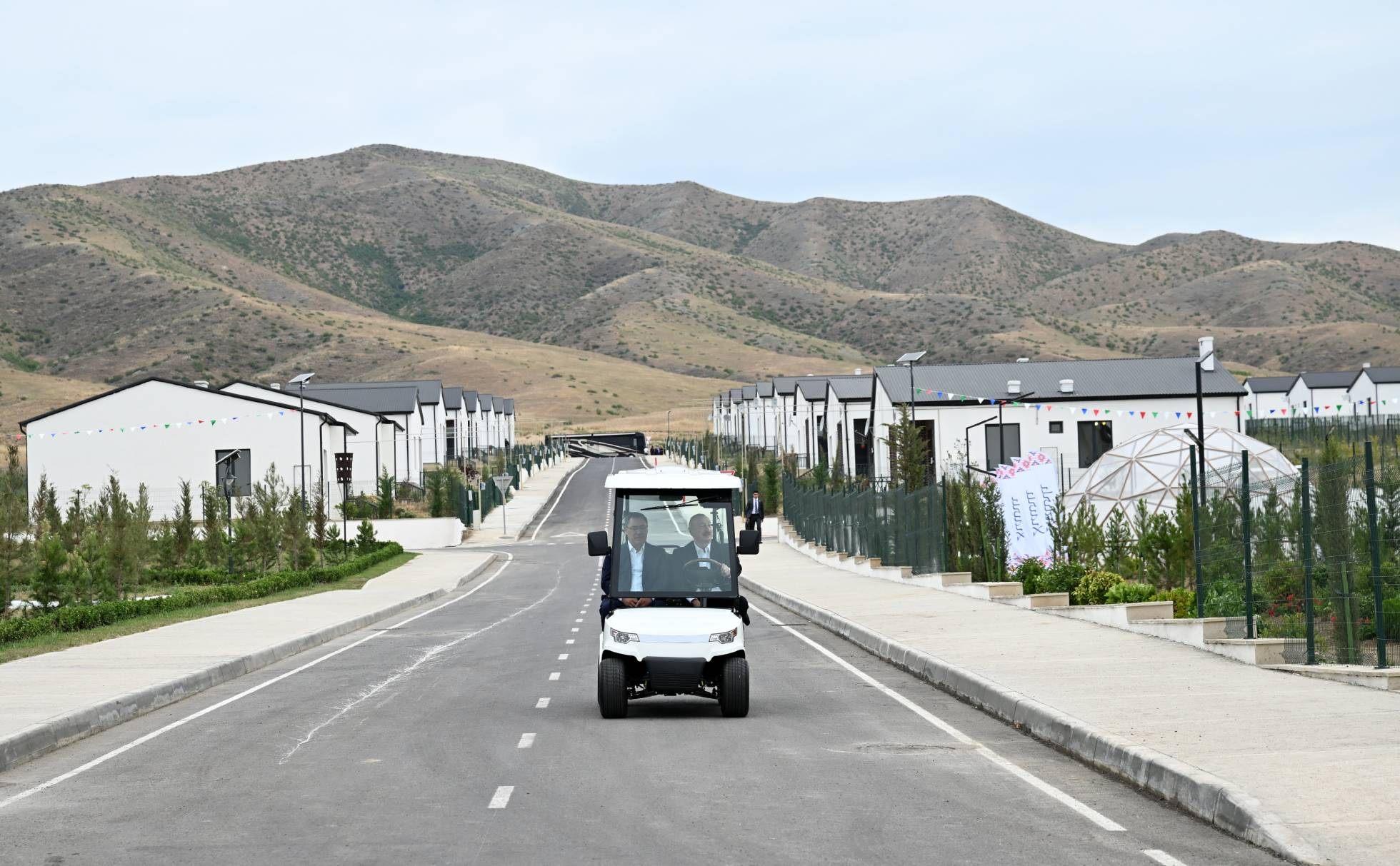
Khidirli, July 2025

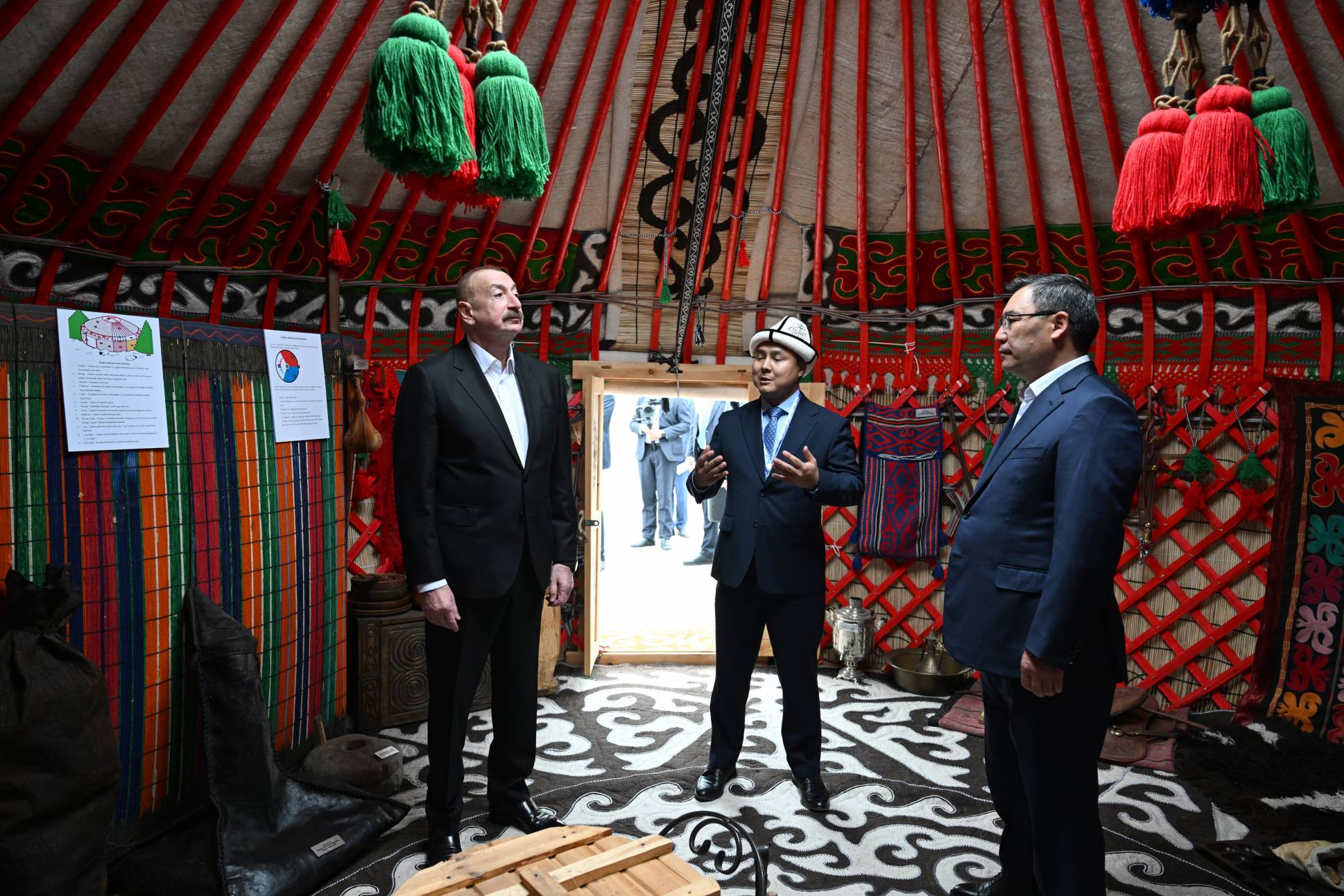
Presidents Ilham Aliyev and Sadyr Japarov visiting a yurt in Khidirli, July 2025
