= Ikhtiyar Kasimov =

Azerbaijani soldier

- Born: March 22, 1970; Agdam District, Azerbaijan
- Died: July 14, 1992 (aged 22); Tartar District, Azerbaijan
- Military career
- Allegiance: Republic of Azerbaijan
- Service years: 1991-1992
- Conflicts: First Nagorno-Karabakh War
- Awards: National Hero of Azerbaijan; 1992

Ikhtiyar Kasimov (Azerbaijani: İxtiyar Qasım oğlu Qasımov) (22 March 1970, Agdam District, Azerbaijan – 14 July 1992, Tartar District, Azerbaijan) was the National Hero of Azerbaijan, and warrior of the First Nagorno-Karabakh War.

== Life and education ==
Ikhtiyar Qasimov was born in Agdam district of Azerbaijan. From 1977 till 1984 he studied up to 8th class in the secondary school in the village of Salahly. In 1985 he came to Baku to continue his education. In 1992 Ikhtiyar voluntarily joined army and went to the Karabakh front.

=== Personal life ===
Kasimov was single.

== First Nagorno-Karabakh War ==
From the first days of the fighting, he received wide acclaim. As a result of the decisions he correctly made in the village of Gazanchi, Armenians lost 3 loading and hauling machines, 1 armored personnel carrier and dozens of militants. On July 14, 1992, Armenians attacked Janyataq village. During the fighting, several Azerbaijani soldiers were injured. To prevent them from being captured by the Armenian soldiers, Ikhtiyar rushed forward and led the counter attack. As a result, it became possible to retreat the wounded from the battlefield. Ikhtiyar however got killed during the fights.

== Honors ==
By Decree of the President of Azerbaijan No. 350 dated December 7, 1992 Qasimov Ikhtiyar Qasim oghlu was posthumously awarded the title of "National Hero of Azerbaijan". He was buried in the village cemetery in Salahly. Secondary school of Salahly village, where he studied, is named after him.

== See also ==
- First Nagorno-Karabakh War
- National Hero of Azerbaijan

== Sources ==
- Vugar Asgarov. Azərbaycanın Milli Qəhrəmanları (Yenidən işlənmiş II nəşr). Bakı: "Dərələyəz-M", 2010, səh. 155.
