= Fikret Hodžić =

Yugoslav bodybuilder (1953–1992)

- Professional bodybuilder
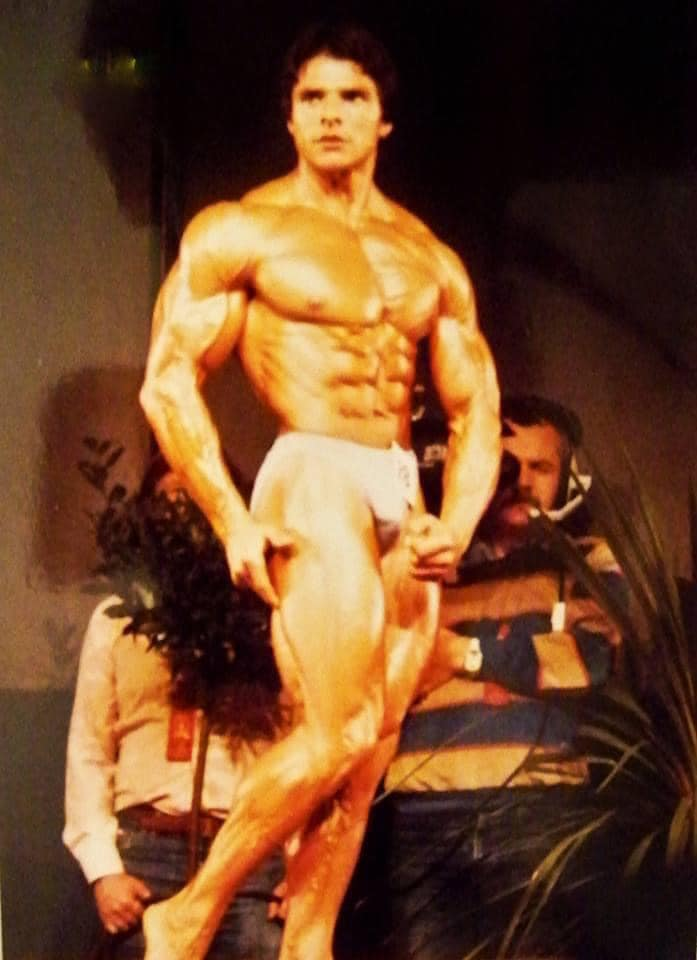

Personal info
- Born: 26 June 1953; Kevljani, Prijedor, PR Bosnia and Herzegovina, FPR Yugoslavia
- Died: 9 July 1992 (aged 39); Trnopolje, Bosnia and Herzegovina

Best statistics
- Height: 172 cm (5 ft 8 in) (contest)
- Weight: 70 kg (contest)

Professional (Pro) career
- Pro-debut: 1976
- Best win: Mr. Universe (6th); 1987
- Active: 1976–1992

Fikret Hodžić (26 June 1953 – 9 July 1992) was a professional Bosnian bodybuilder. Hodžić competed during the 1970s and 1980s representing the Socialist Federal Republic of Yugoslavia.

Hodžić began bodybuilding in 1973. He was inspired by Petar Čelik. He briefly had to stop training while completing mandatory military service. Hodžić was the bodybuilding champion of Yugoslavia for 15 consecutive years spanning 1976–1991. He founded the first bodybuilding club in Bosnia and Herzegovina, Partizan, in 1975.

During the war he was killed near his home in Trnopolje in Bosnia and Herzegovina by a Serbian soldier, a former student of his. His wife and two children sought refuge in Austria. After hearing of Hodžić's murder, Arnold Schwarzenegger sent his condolences to the family. Hodžić's 20-year-old son Đemal was murdered in Sanski Most in 2000 by a local criminal.

His remains were found in a mass grave in January 2009 and were properly buried on 20 July 2009, a full 17 years after his murder.

== International competitions ==
- 1981

European Amateur Championships - IFBB, Lightweight, 2nd
World Amateur Championships - IFBB, Lightweight, 3rd

- 1982

European Amateur Championships - IFBB, Lightweight, 5th
World Amateur Championships - IFBB, Lightweight, 4th

- 1986

European Amateur Championships - IFBB, Lightweight, 4th

- 1987

Mr Universe - NABBA, Short, 6th

- 1989

World Amateur Championships - IFBB, Lightweight, 13th
