= Arne Falk-Rønne =

Arne Falk-Rønne (5 December 1920 - 9 July 1992) was a Danish travel writer and photographer. He was a member of "The Adventurers' Club of Denmark".

He was educated as a journalist, and wrote travelling pieces for Familie Journalen, accompanied by his own photographs. Falk-Rønne travelled all over the world, and wrote 50 books about his journeys. He has been translated into more than 13 languages. He was included in the "Krak's Blå Bog" Who's Who reference book.

== Bibliography ==
Incomplete

- Abenteuer auf Monte Christo (Franksche Verlagsbuchhandlung 1957)
- Paradis om bagbord (Steen Hasselbachs Forlag 1965, 1968 in German "Paradies an Backbord", Bertelsmann Verlag Gütersloh)
