= Musée international d'Art naïf Anatole Jakovsky =

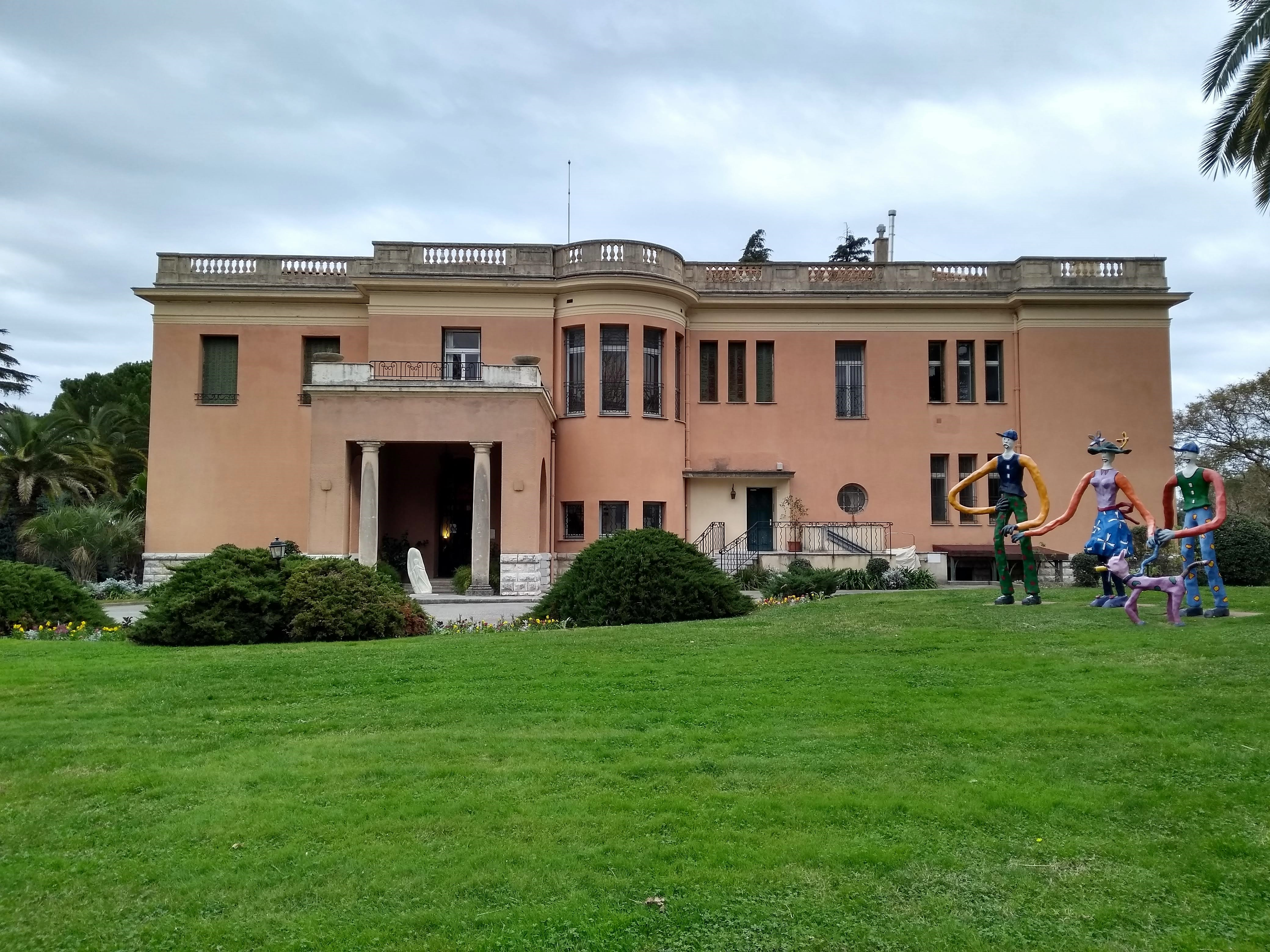
- The exterior of the museum in 2020

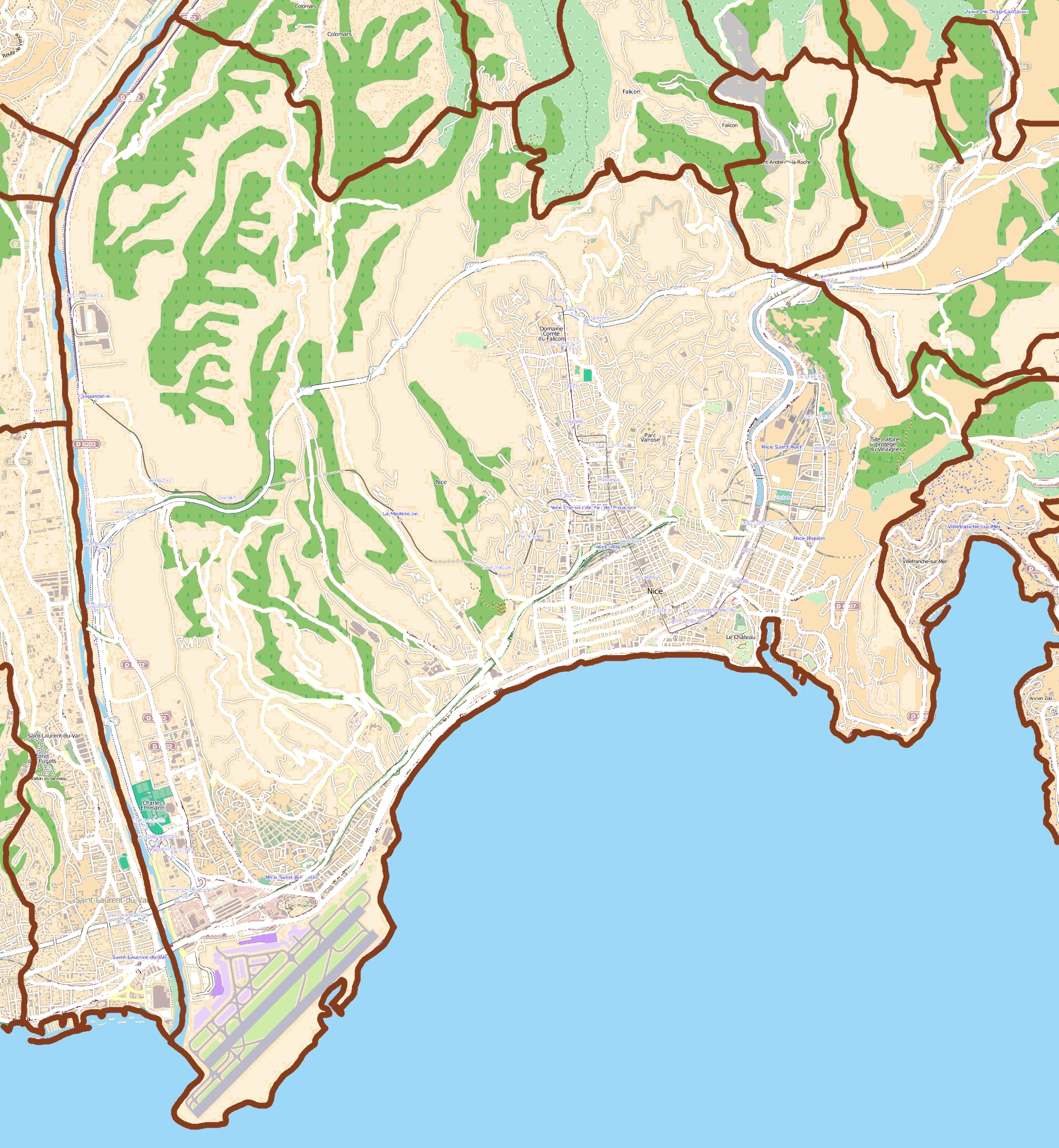
- Location within Nice
- Established: 1982
- Location: Avenue de Fabron; 06000 Nice, France
- Coordinates: 43.686111°N 7.232778°E
- Type: Art museum
- Visitors: 20,000 per year

The Musée international d'Art naïf Anatole Jakovsky (Eng.: Anatole Jakovsky International Museum of Naive Art) is a museum located in Nice, which displays 18th–21st century works specialized in naive art. The museum was inaugurated on 5 March 1982.

== History and description ==
The museum was housed in the Château Saint Hélène which was the former residence of perfumer François Coty, and is located in a large park. In 1930, his ex-wife Yvonne decide to order changes in the building by Nice architect H. Malgaud who removed the sets designed by Aaron Messiah. Her daughter Christiane Coty sold the castle to the city of Nice on 6 April 1973, and the building was eventually transformed into a museum, which opened in 1982.

The works are composed of paintings, sculptures, drawings, posters by painters such as Henri Rousseau, Séraphine Louis, Grandma Moses, O'Brady, Rimbert, Ivan and Josip Généralic, Bauchant, Vivin, Lackovic, Haddelsey, Ligabue, Vivancos, among others.

The collection come from donations of Renée and Anatole Jakovsky (to whom the museum owes its current name), and the Centre Georges Pompidou. The giant statues in the garden were created by Frédéric Lanovsky. The museum has about 20,000 visitors per year, and 600 works from 27 countries.
