= Thomas R. Kratochwill =

American psychologist

Thomas Rudy Kratochwill (born July 18, 1946) is an American academic. He was professor of school psychology at the University of Wisconsin–Madison, where he directed the School Psychology program before retiring in 2016.

His research and publication work focuses on diagnosis, assessment, and treatment of child psychopathology, as well as the application of mediator-based treatments in schools for the prevention and treatment of childhood problems.

He was founding editor of the APA journal School Psychology Quarterly from 1984 to 1992. He is editor of Advances in School Psychology (annual research series), and associate editor of Behavior Therapy, Journal of Applied Behavior Analysis, and School Psychology Review.

== Education ==
Kratochwill earned his PhD from the University of Wisconsin–Madison in 1973.

== Awards and honors ==
Kratochwill's research has received recognition from national and state organizations, including the American Psychological Association's (APA) Award for Distinguished Contribution to Education and Training in Psychology in 2007.

In 1995 he received an award for Outstanding Contributions to the Advancement of Scientific Knowledge in Psychology from the Wisconsin Psychological Association and was awarded the Senior Scientist Award from APA Division 16.

He received the Distinguished Service Award from the School of Education at the University of Wisconsin–Madison and in 2005 received the Jack I. Bardon Distinguished Achievement Award from APA Division 16.

In 1977 he received the APA's Lightner Witner Award and in 1981 was awarded the Outstanding Research Contributions Award from the Arizona State Psychological Association.
