= Anatole Jakovsky =

French art critic (1909–1983)

Anatole Jakovsky (13 August 1909 – 24 September 1983) was a French art critic who wrote substantially, collected widely, and established a museum in Nice for Naïve art, Musée international d'Art naïf Anatole Jakovsky.

Atole Jakovsky was born in Chişinău (now Republic of Moldova) to a Polish father and Romanian mother. In 1932, he moved from Romania to Paris. He met the secretary of Prokofiev who introduced him amongst the artistic colony of Montparnasse. There he developed a binding friendship with Jean Hélion and mingled with the abstract artists who revolved around Michel Seuphor and Joaquín Torres García.

Soon Anatole Jakovsky became an art critic focusing on the abstract painters and in particular the Abstraction "movement - Creation " of Auguste Herbin of whom he wrote the first monograph. His first papers are devoted to Calder, Arp, Delaunay, Hélion, Mondrian, Nicholson, Pevsner, Seligmann, Villon, Vulliamy, Braque, Picasso, Zadkine... All of whom become friends. He also maintained a very close relationship with Robert Delaunay. Together, in 1939, they created "The Keys of the Paving Stones", the first plastic book. It is a collection of poems signed "Anatole Delagrave", illustrated by Robert Delaunay and made of plates of rhodoïde fluorescent. It is the first and last time that Anatole Jakovsky had recourse to a pseudonym. The work was drawn with 100 plates which are on show at the

In the process of exploring various avenues of interest, Jakovsky met the naïve painter Jean Fous. There, in 1942, while helping him unpack books and various objects, he discovered canvases in a portfolio case of a Rousseau Customs officer which caught his interest. From that moment on, Anatole Jakovsky officially devoted himself to defend, promote and collect naïve painting.

In 1949, he made his first appearance with the Editions J Damase in Paris, his first significant work on this artistic expression: "Naive painting". He did not cease writing forewords, monographs, and critical pieces as well as organizing international exhibitions of Naïve art, gathering little by little probably the most significant collection of naïve paintings, which he eventually donated with all his files to the town of Nice in 1978.

Four years later, the Museum of the Castle of Sainte-Hélène bearing her name, preserved 600 canvases and drawings, sculptures, paintings under glass recalling the complete history of the Naïve art from the 17th century to the present time. Jakovsky's files have been integrated into the museum archives which holds exceptional documents legitimating the existence of this art among the first steps of all autonomous creations of the 20th century.

Parallel with his interest in naïve painting, Anatole Jakovsky developed an interest in Gaston Chaissac of whom he wrote the first biography; Alphonse Allais, whom he discovered; the history of tobacco, the collections of pipes which it compared with Marcel Duchamp; old robots; old postcards; the history of the Eiffel Tower; the Palate of the Factor Horse and the Rocks of Rotheneuf; art populaire... Anatole maintained a special correspondence with the artist Jean-Joseph Sanfourche, a figure of art brut and art singulier.

Atole Jakovsky foresaw man on the moon and predicted World War II war as early as 1935.
