= Khnapat =

Khnapat / Khanabad Խնապատ / Xanabad
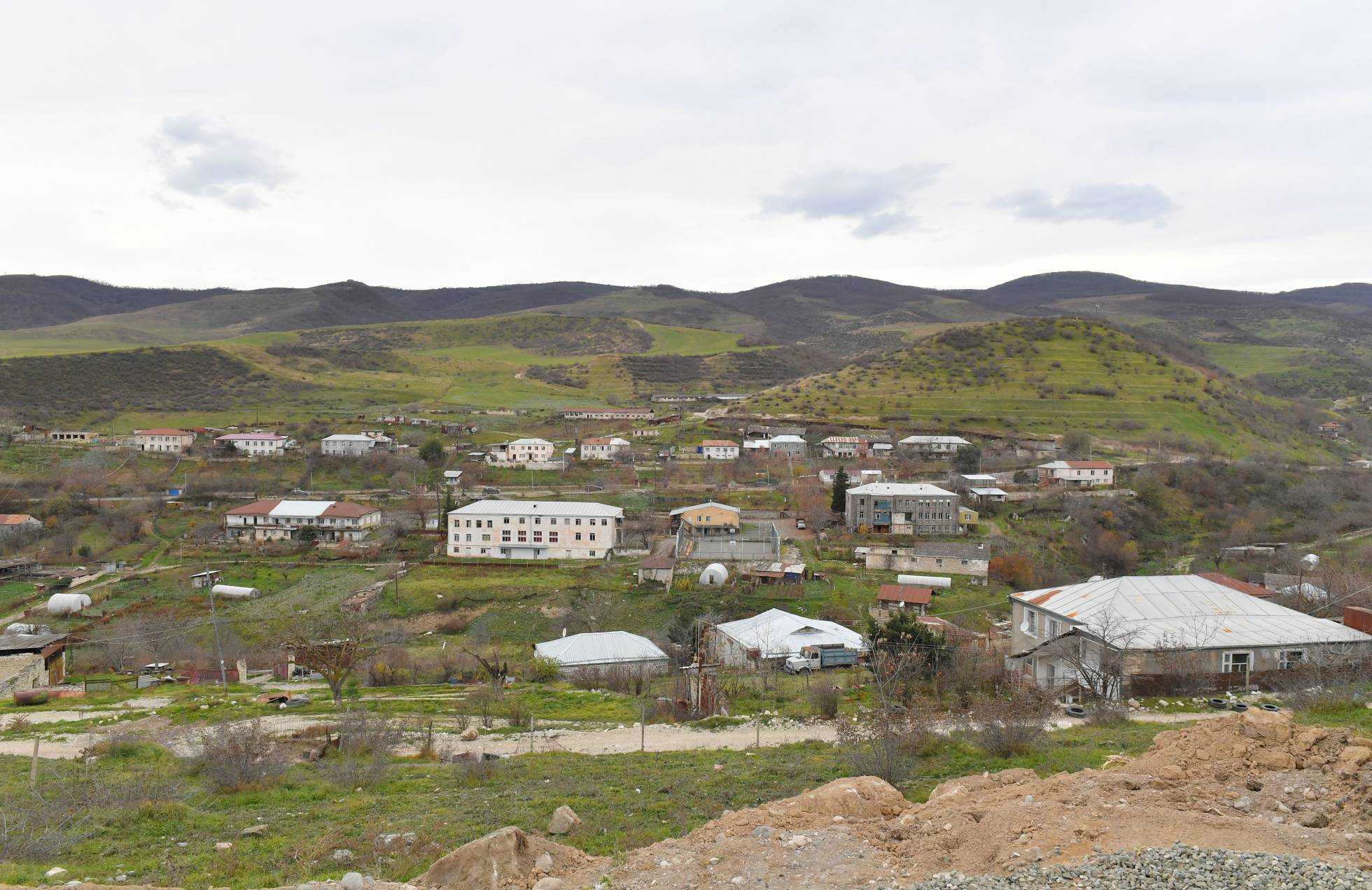

- Location within Azerbaijan Location within Karabakh Economic Region
- Coordinates: 39°58′08″N 46°49′01″E
- Country: Azerbaijan
  - District: Khojaly

Population (2015)
  - Total: 1,042
- Time zone: UTC+4 (AZT)

Khnapat (Armenian: Խնապատ) or Khanabad (Armenian: Խանաբադ; Azerbaijani: Xanabad) is a village in the Khojaly District of Azerbaijan, in the region of Nagorno-Karabakh. Until 2023 it was controlled by the breakaway Republic of Artsakh. The village had an ethnic Armenian-majority population until the expulsion of the Armenian population of Nagorno-Karabakh by Azerbaijan following the 2023 Azerbaijani offensive in Nagorno-Karabakh.

== History ==
Khnapat is regarded as one of the most ancient settlements in Artsakh. This is attested by burial grounds dating to the second and first millennia BCE, along with the remains of early villages and cemeteries found within the village territory. The modern village was founded in the early 19th century by settlers from the nearby Armenian mountain villages of Jrver and Yereshen. During the Soviet period, the village was part of the Askeran District of the Nagorno-Karabakh Autonomous Oblast.

== Historical heritage sites ==
Historical heritage sites in and around the village include the nearby ruined village of Jrver (Armenian: Ջրվեր, also known as Hanatak) from between the 12th and 17th centuries, the ruined village of Verin Ghlijbagh (Armenian: Վերին Ղլիջբաղ) from between the 12th and 19th centuries 3 km to the west of Khnapat, a 9th/13th-century khachkar, a chapel built in 1224, the medieval cave-shrine of Mets Nan (Armenian: Մեծ նան), a 17th-century cemetery, the ruined village of Yereshen (Armenian: Երեշեն) from between the 18th and 20th centuries, the 19th-century church of Surb Astvatsatsin (Armenian: Սուրբ Աստվածածին, lit. 'Holy Mother of God'), and a 19th/20th-century cemetery.

== Economy and culture ==
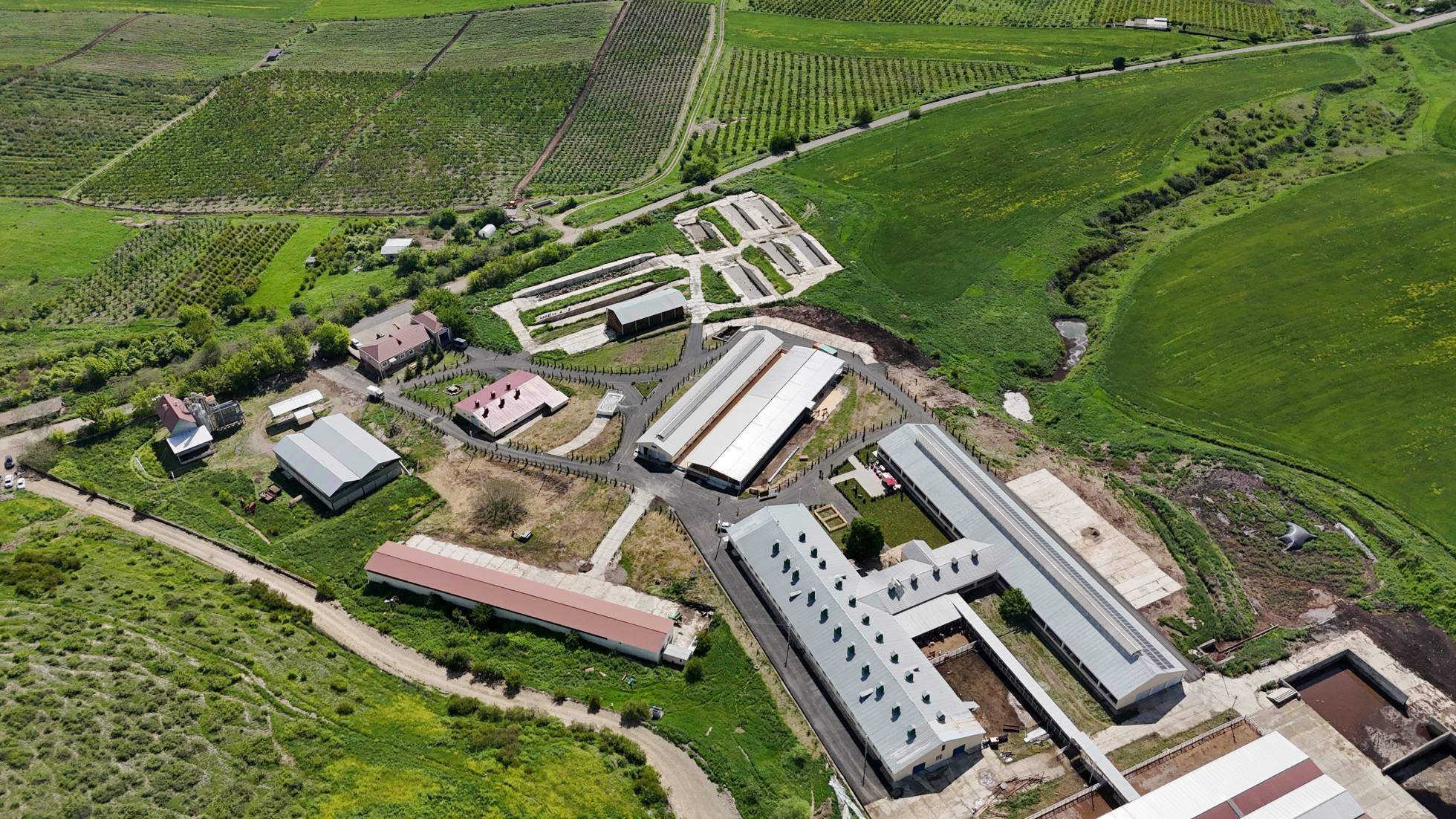
Livestock Complex Qoç Ət Khanabad

The population is mainly engaged in agriculture and animal husbandry, as well as in different state institutions. As of 2015, the village has a municipal building, a house of culture, a secondary school, a music school, a kindergarten, three shops, and a medical centre.

== Demographics ==
The village had 827 inhabitants in 2005, and 1,042 inhabitants in 2015.

As of February 2026, 38 Azerbaijani families, totaling 154 individuals, have been resettled in the Khanabad village by Azerbaijan.

== Gallery ==
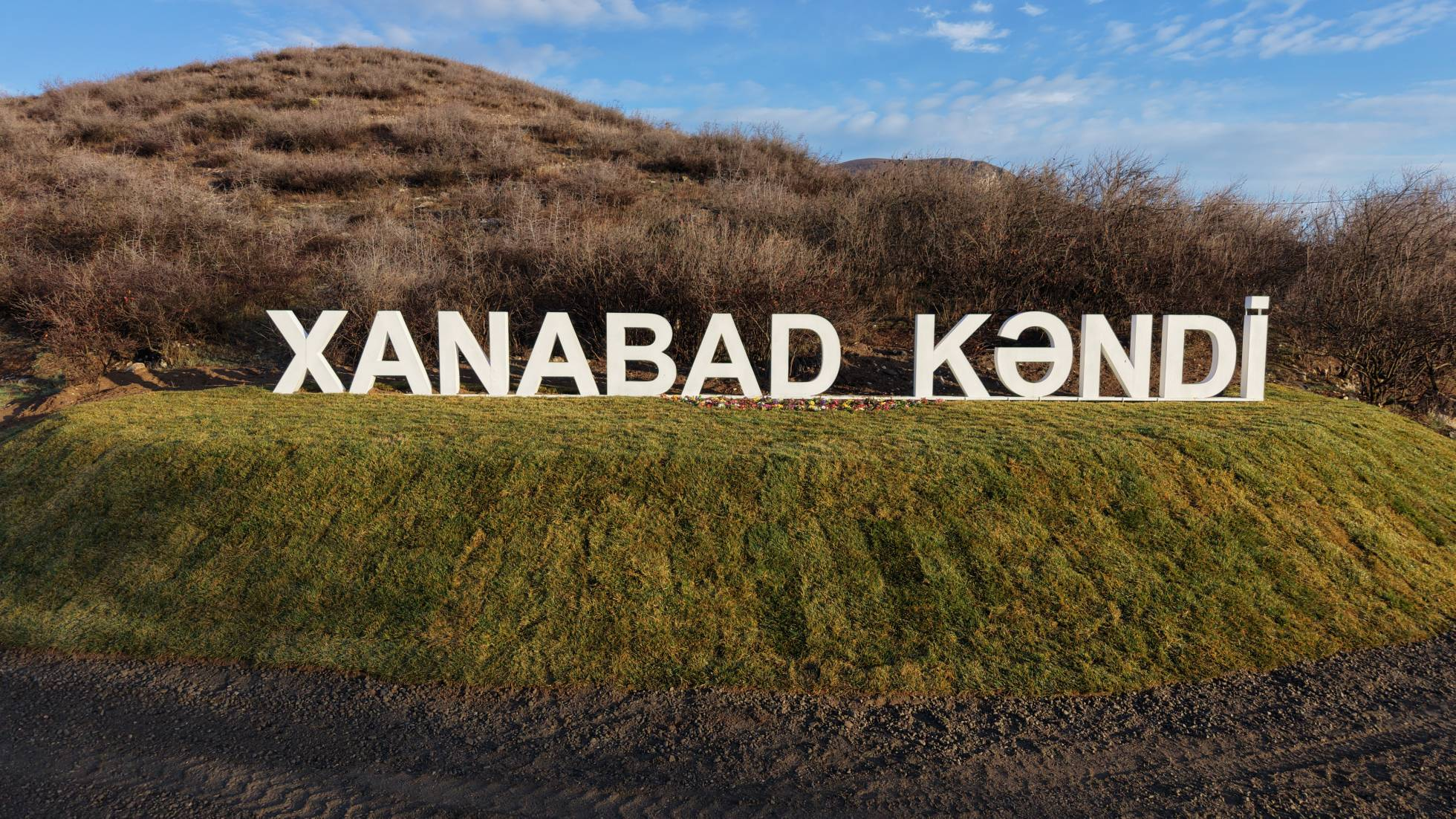

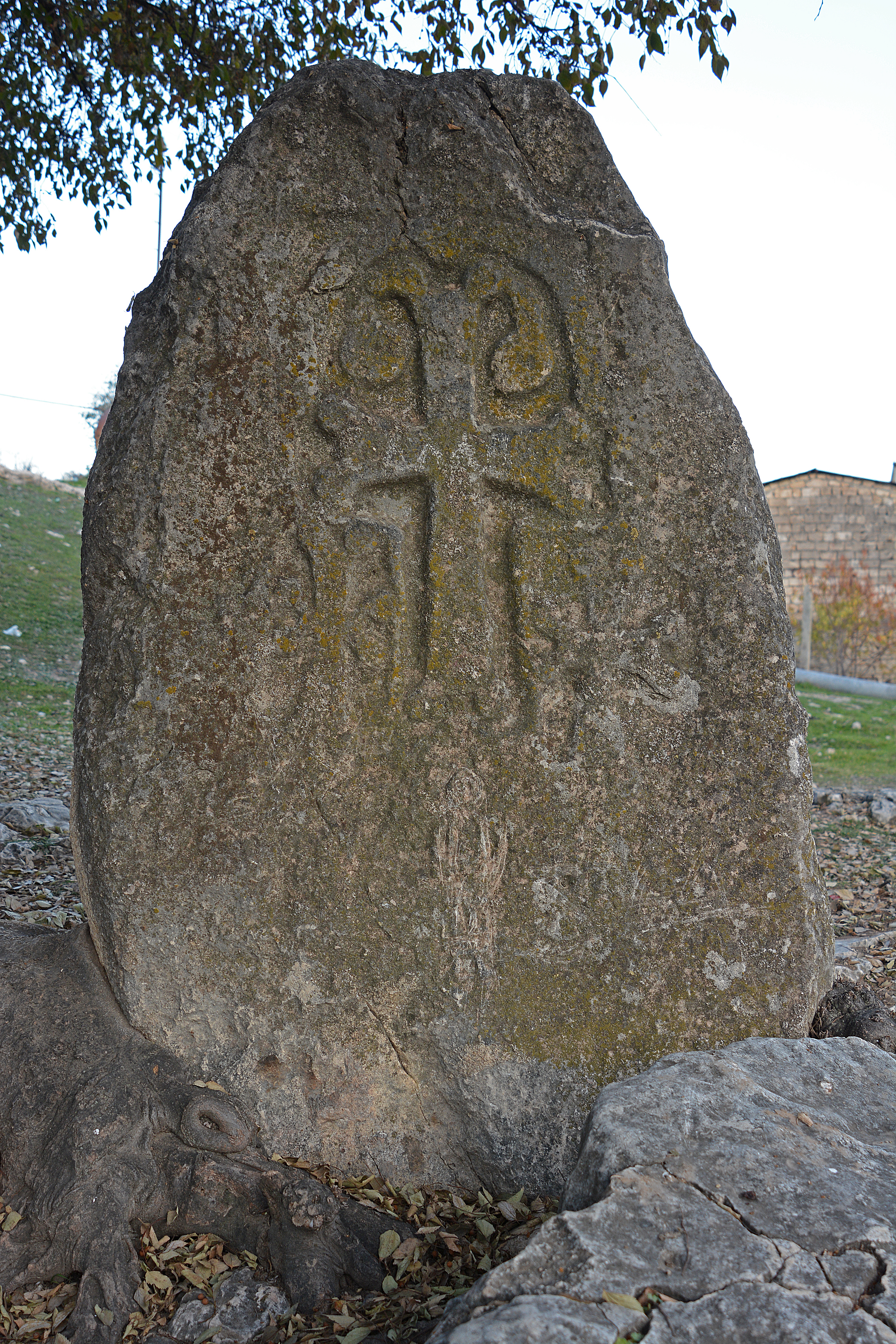
Khachkar

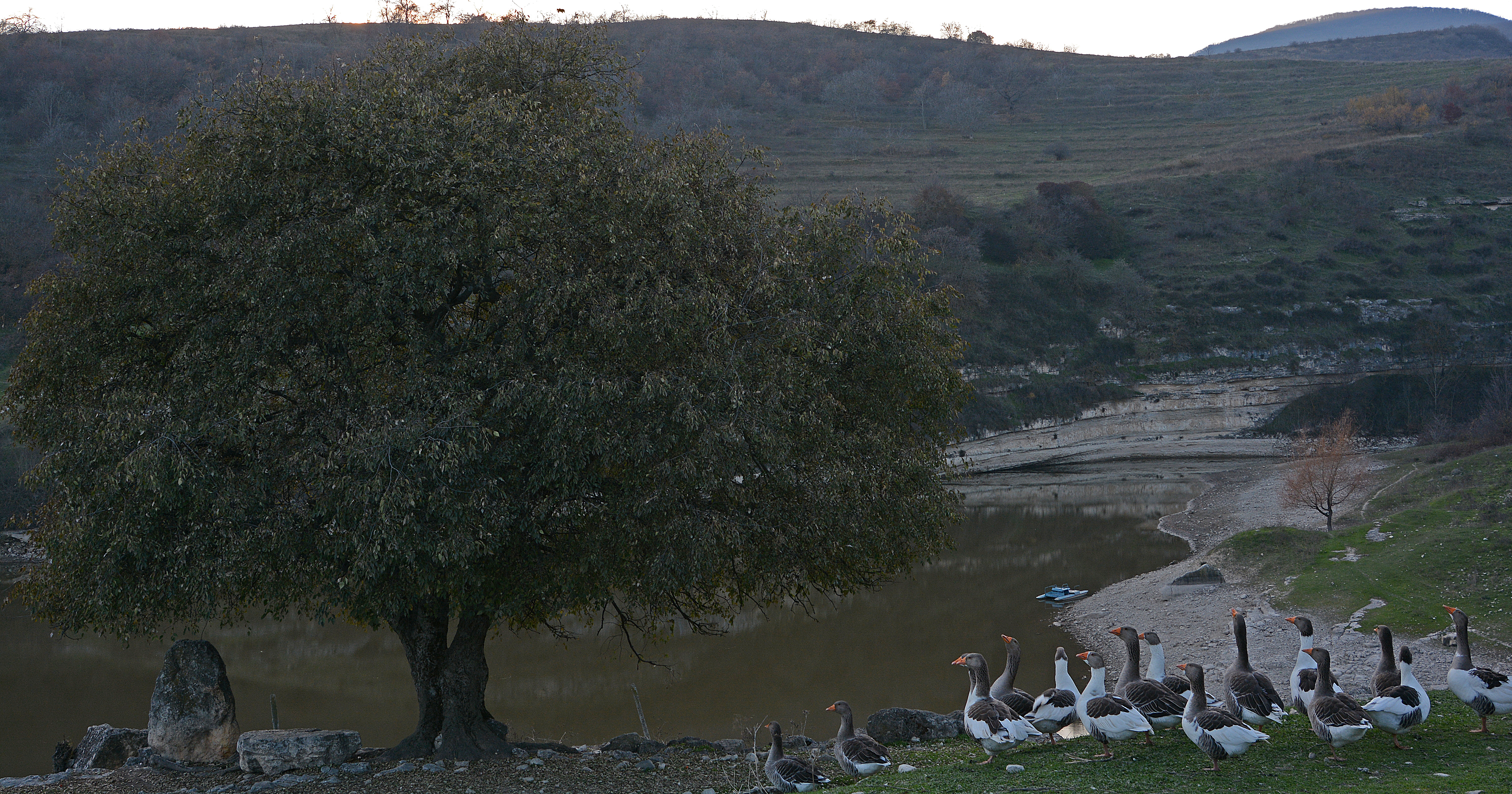
Landscape

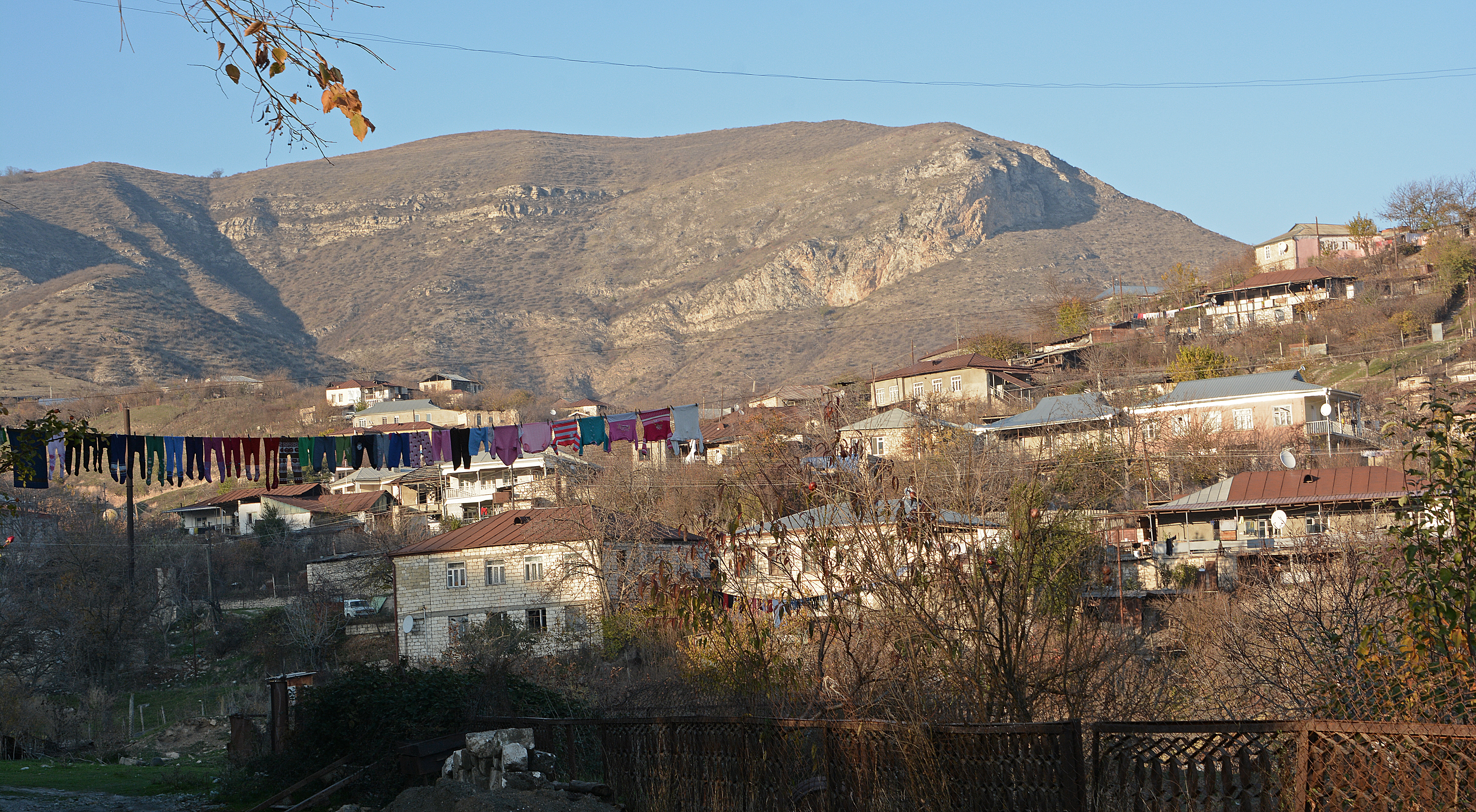
Panorama

Scenery

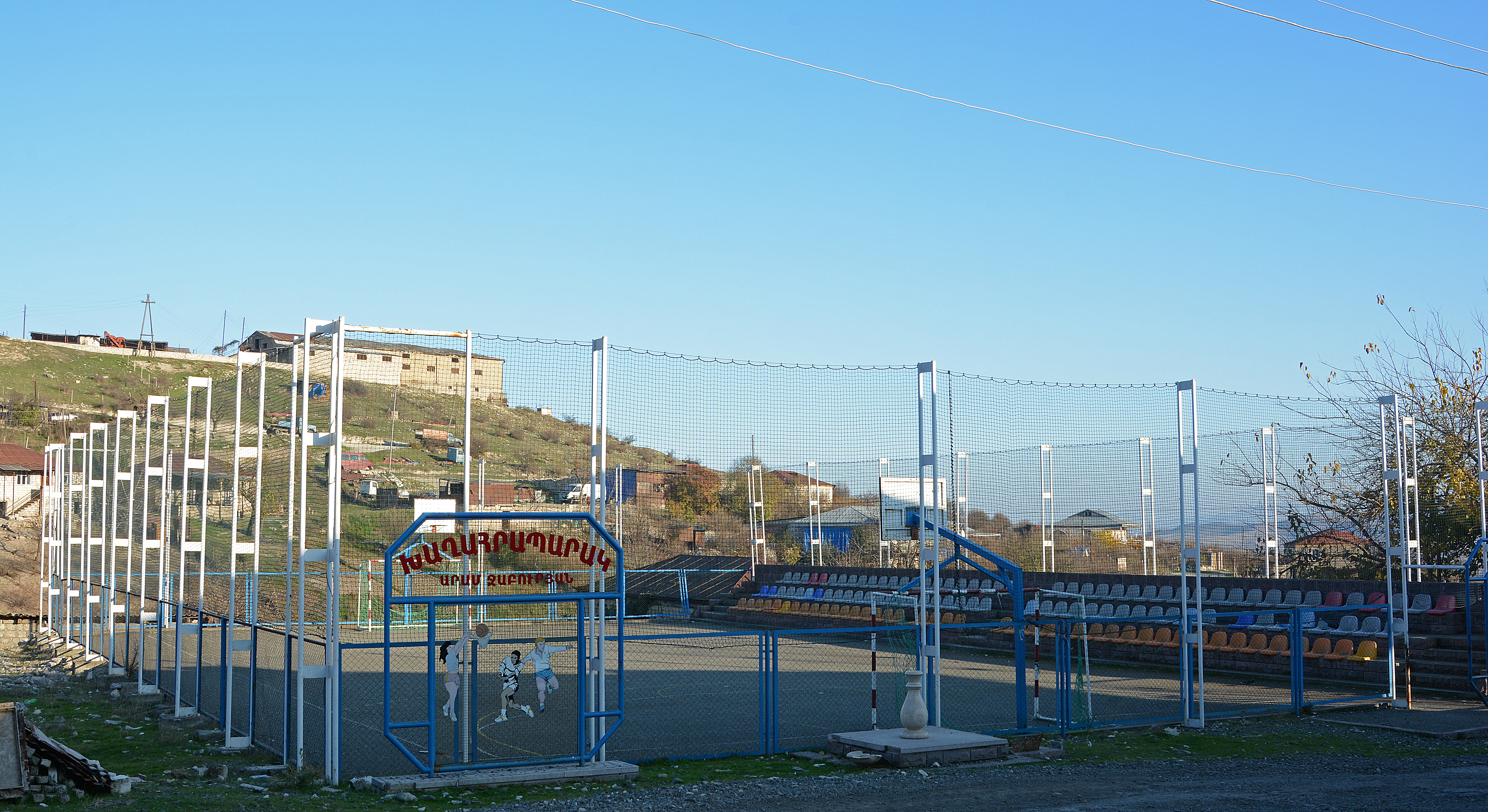
Playground

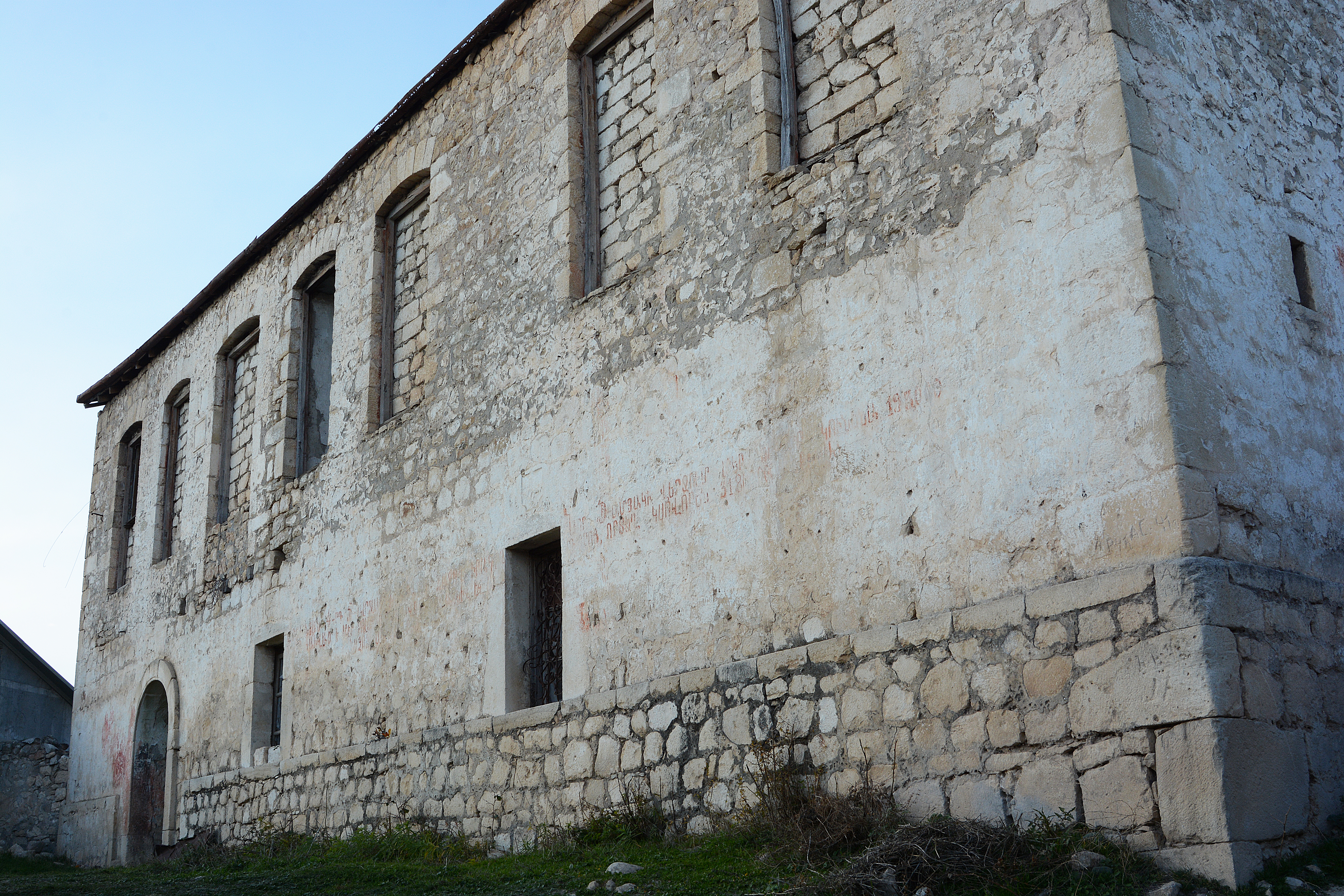
Church

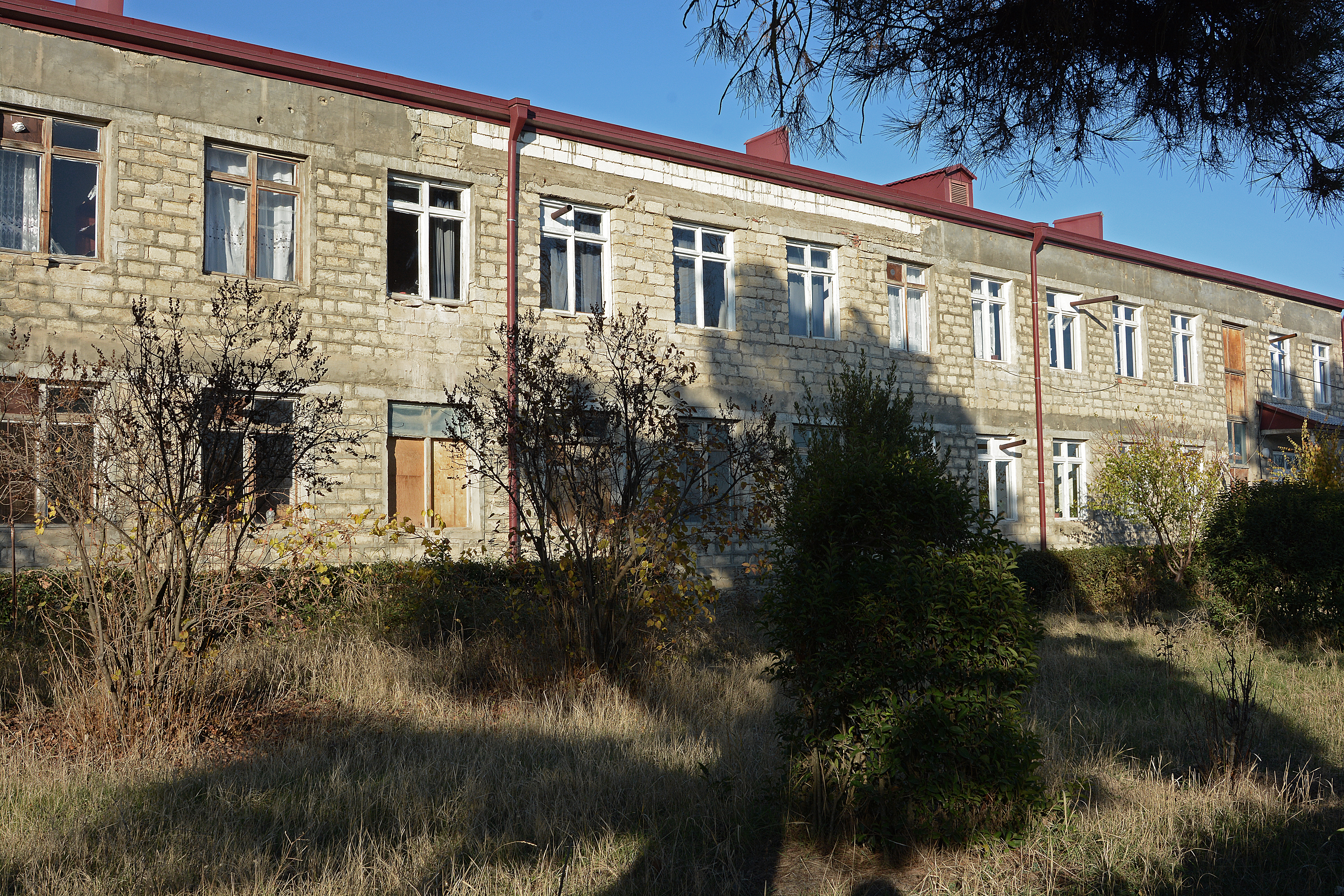
School
