= Anna Kocková-Kratochvílova =

Slovak botanist and microbiologist (1915–1992)

- Born: 2 March 1915; Tuzla, Austria-Hungary
- Died: 22 July 1992 (aged 77); Malacky, Czechoslovakia
- Resting place: Plzeň, Czech Republic
- Education: Faculty of Science, Charles University
- Scientific career
- Fields: Botany, microbiology and plant physiology; the taxonomy of yeasts
- Workplaces: Research Institute for Vitamin and Hormonal Chemistry; Brewery and Malting Research Institute (Prague); Slovak University of Technology in Bratislava; Slovak Academy of Sciences; University of Greifswald
- Thesis: The significance of fermentation types
- Author abbrev. (botany): Kock.-Krat.

Anna Kocková-Kratochvílova (2 March 1915 – 22 July 1992) was a Slovak botanist and microbiologist known for her work on plant physiology, specifically the taxonomy of yeasts and yeast-like microorganisms. The standard form of her botanist author abbreviation is "Kock.-Krat."

== Biography ==
Kocková-Kratochvílova was born on 2 March 1915 in Tuzla, Austria-Hungary (now part of Bosnia and Herzegovina).

Kocková-Kratochvílova studied plant physiology at the Faculty of Science, Charles University. She began her career at the Research Institute for Vitamin and Hormonal Chemistry in Prague (1941–1945), where she developed new ways of identifying pathogenic yeasts and expanded the collections of bacteria, fungi and yeasts.

In 1946, Kocková-Kratochvílova was the founder of the Yeast Culture Collection at the Brewery and Malting Research Institute in Prague, where she also worked as head of the microbiology department until 1953.

Kocková-Kratochvílova moved to working in universities from 1953, working at the Faculty of Chemistry at the Slovak University of Technology in Bratislava (SVŠT, 1953–1958) and the Chemical Institute of the Slovak Academy of Sciences in Bratislava (1959–1986). She lectured in microbiology at the University of Greifswald in Mecklenburg, Germany, for a year (1970–1971).

Kocková-Kratochvílova's research focused on the numerical taxonomy of yeasts and yeast-like microorganisms. She discovered new species belonging to the genera Candida, Cryptococcus and Sporobolomyces. The standard form of her botanist author abbreviation is "Kock.-Krat." The species Rhodosporidium kratochvilovae and genus Kockovaella were named after her by Japanese researchers.

From 1977, Kocková-Kratochvílova was a member of the committee of the World Federation of Collections of Cultures of Microorganisms at the International Commission on Yeasts (ICY) and resigned in 1989. She was a member of the Czechoslovak Society of Microbiology.

Kocková-Kratochvílova retired in 1986. She died on 22 July 1992 in Malacky, Czechoslovakia. She was buried in Plzeň, Czechoslovakia.
