= Mokhtar =

Mokhtar may refer to:

== Places ==
- Bordj Badji Mokhtar, desert town in southwestern Algeria
- Bordj Badji Mokhtar District, district in Algeria
- Cham Mokhtar, village in Iran
- Chebaita Mokhtar, town and commune in Algeria
- Tam-e Mokhtar, village in Iran
- Mokhtar, Kohgiluyeh and Boyer-Ahmad, village in Iran
- Mokhtar, Sistan and Baluchestan, village in Iran

== Other ==
- Mokhtar (film)
- Mokhtar (name)
- El Mokhtar, an Arabian horse

== See also ==
- Mukhtar (disambiguation), the head of a village or neighbourhood in many Arab countries as well as in Turkey and Cyprus
