= Moktar =

Moktar may refer to:

- Bung Moktar Radin (1959–2025), Malaysian politician who served as the Member of Parliament (MP) for Kinabatangan from 1999 to 2025
- Moktar (given name), list of people with the given name
- Moktar (surname), list of people with the surname
