= Mukhtar (disambiguation) =

A mukhtar is a village chief in many Arab countries and Cyprus.

Mukhtar may also refer to:

- Mukhtar (name), an Arabic given name and surname
- Mukhtar Army, a Shi'a Iraqi militia group formed in February 2013
- Mukhtar Museum, in Cairo, Egypt
- Mkhitarashen (or Mukhtar), a village in Nagorno-Karabakh
- Sherif Mukhtar, village in Sudan

== See also ==
- Mokhtar (disambiguation)
- Mukhtaran (disambiguation)
- Muhtar (disambiguation)
- Muhtar (title)
