= Moktar (given name) =

Arabic given name

Moktar is a masculine given name of Arabic origin. It is most commonly associated with Bung Moktar Radin (1959–2025), a Malaysian politician who served as the Member of Parliament (MP) for Kinabatangan from 1999 to 2025. Notable people with the name include:

== Given name ==
- Moktar Ould Daddah (1924–2003), Mauritanian politician who served as the country's first President from 1960 to 1978
- Moktar Hasni (1952–2024), Tunisian professional footballer
- Moktar Hossain, Bangladeshi politician
- Moktar Mangane (born 1982), Senegalese footballer

== Fictional characters ==
- Moktar, drug dealer character in the action drama film Athena (2022)

== See also ==
- Md. Moktar Ali (fl. 2026), Bangladesh politician, Member of Parliament, and professor
- Mokhtar (name), list of people with the given name and surname
- Mukhtar (name), list of people with the given name and surname
