= Mukhtaran =

Mukhtaran may refer to:

- Mukhtaran Bibi, Pakistani rape victim
- Mukhtaran, Iran, a village in South Khorasan Province, Iran

== See also ==
- Mukhtar (disambiguation)
