= Poloz Mukuch =

Armenian satirist and fabulist

Poloz Mukuch Պոլոզ Մուկուչ
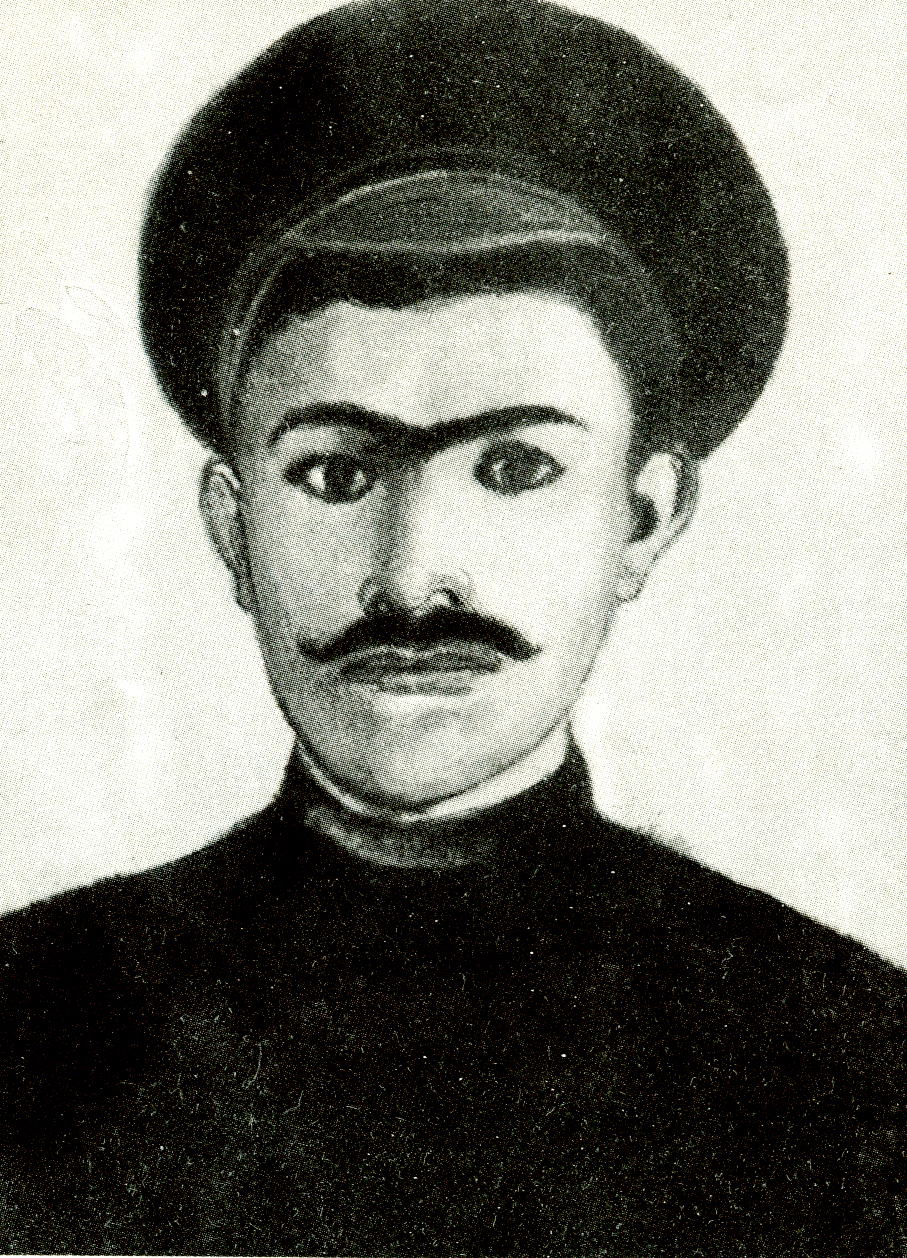
- Born: Mkrtich Melkonyan; 7 January 1881; Alexandropol, Erivan Governorate)
- Died: 15 February 1931 (aged 50); Leninakan, Armenian SSR
- Citizenship: Russian Empire, USSR
- Occupations: satirist, fabulist

Poloz Mukuch (real name Mkrtich Ghazarosi Melkonyan, 7 January 1881, Alexandropol, Erivan Governorate, Russian Empire - 15 February 1931, Leninakan, Armenian SSR, TSFSR, USSR) was a popular Armenian satirist and fabulist from Gyumri.

== Biography ==
Mkrtich Melkonyan was born in the family of a blacksmith. Because of his height, Mukuch (a diminutive of Mkrtich) earned the nickname "Poloz" (a colloquial word meaning disproportionally tall). Instead of learning his father's trade, Mukuch, after receiving elementary education, became a "podratchi" (a street trader). He would park his cart at various city sites and, as he sold fruits and melons, he would tell endless witty jokes and funny stories, many of them based on real events, which made him very popular around Gyumri. Contemporaries say that he had a cheerful character, but during working hours his mind was on selling goods and satisfying his customers. He was a very witty man, he made jokes with a serious face without a smile while the people in front of him fainted from laughter. He was a schoolmate of the famous Armenian author Avetik Isahakyan. Many fables and funny stories previously attributed to foreign fabulists, are associated with Poloz Mulkuch's name in Armenian circles. In this aspect Poloz Mukuch contributed to nationalization of Armenian verbal satire.

== Legacy ==
As a charismatic person, he attracted the attention of a number of artists. His immense popularity was attested by the whole Leninakan population participating in his funeral in 1931. Avetik Isahakyan erected a monument on his tomb, writing that:

The world's nations attribute their fables, anekdotes, sayings to a single person and immortalize him. That is how Mukuch was for our people. The difference is that others are a myth, there was no real person, the place of the grave is not known, and Poloz Mukuch was a real person, and there is a grave.

— Avetik Isahakyan

Another Armenian writer wrote a quatrain about this:

Poloz Mukuch passed away,
And Boshi Tagh ached with great mourn,
And on the tomb of good old Gyumri citizen
Poet Avo has cut a stone.

— Khachik Dashtents

Painter Hakob Ananikyan created a series of portraits, for which Poloz Mukuch served as a prototype. Poloz Mukuch served as a prototype for the protagonist in Khachik Dashtents's poem "Phaeton Alek". Poloz Mukuch's statue, made by Narek Samvelyan was opened in Gyumri Holy Savior Church yard in 2012. Poloz Mukuch Beerhouse, occupying an old mansion built in the 1860s, was opened in the 1960s in Soviet Armenia in the historic district of Kumayri, named after Poloz Mukuch. The property was privatized in late 1990s, continuing to function as a beerhouse. A bust of Poloz Mukuch was placed at the entrance. Nowadays, the beerhouse is one of Gyumri's prominent landmarks.

Armenian Centre of PR development is planning to reanimate Gyumri's Poloz Mukuch, along with Karabakh's Pele Pughi, in a new multi-language animated film series, taking the example of films about Nasreddin.

== Gallery ==
Poloz Mukuch in life and art
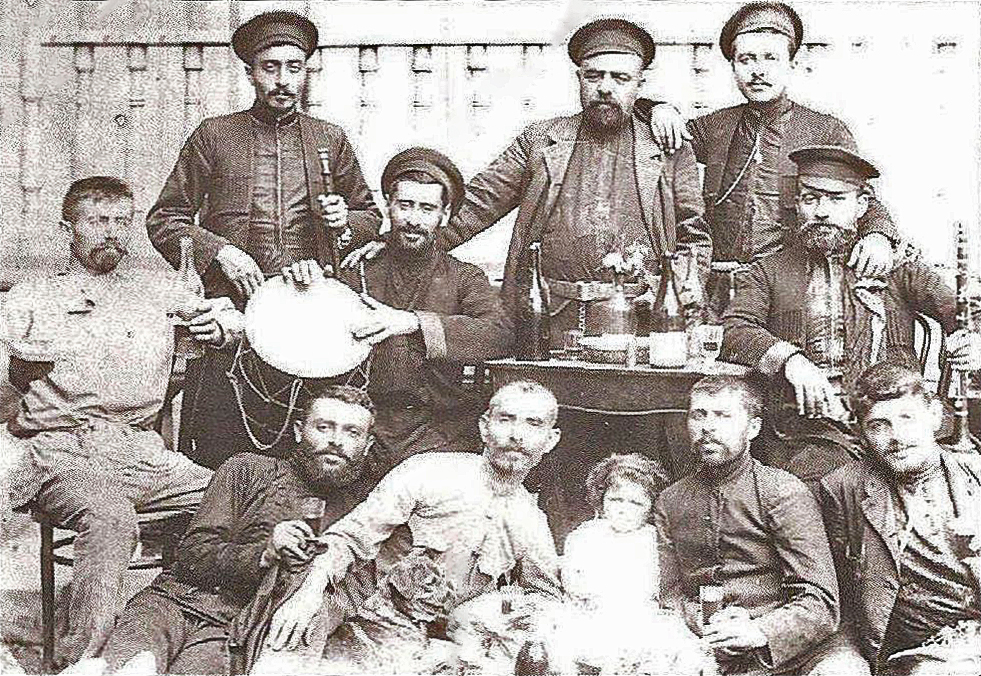
Poloz Mukuch (in the centre with dhol) and Tsitro Alek (second in bottom on the left) with their musical band

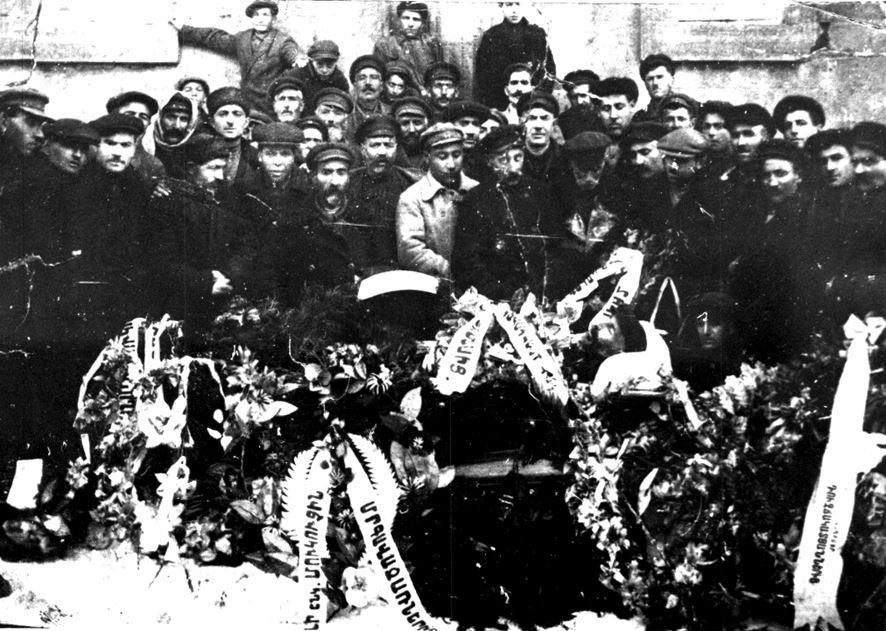
Poloz Mukuch's funeral in 1931

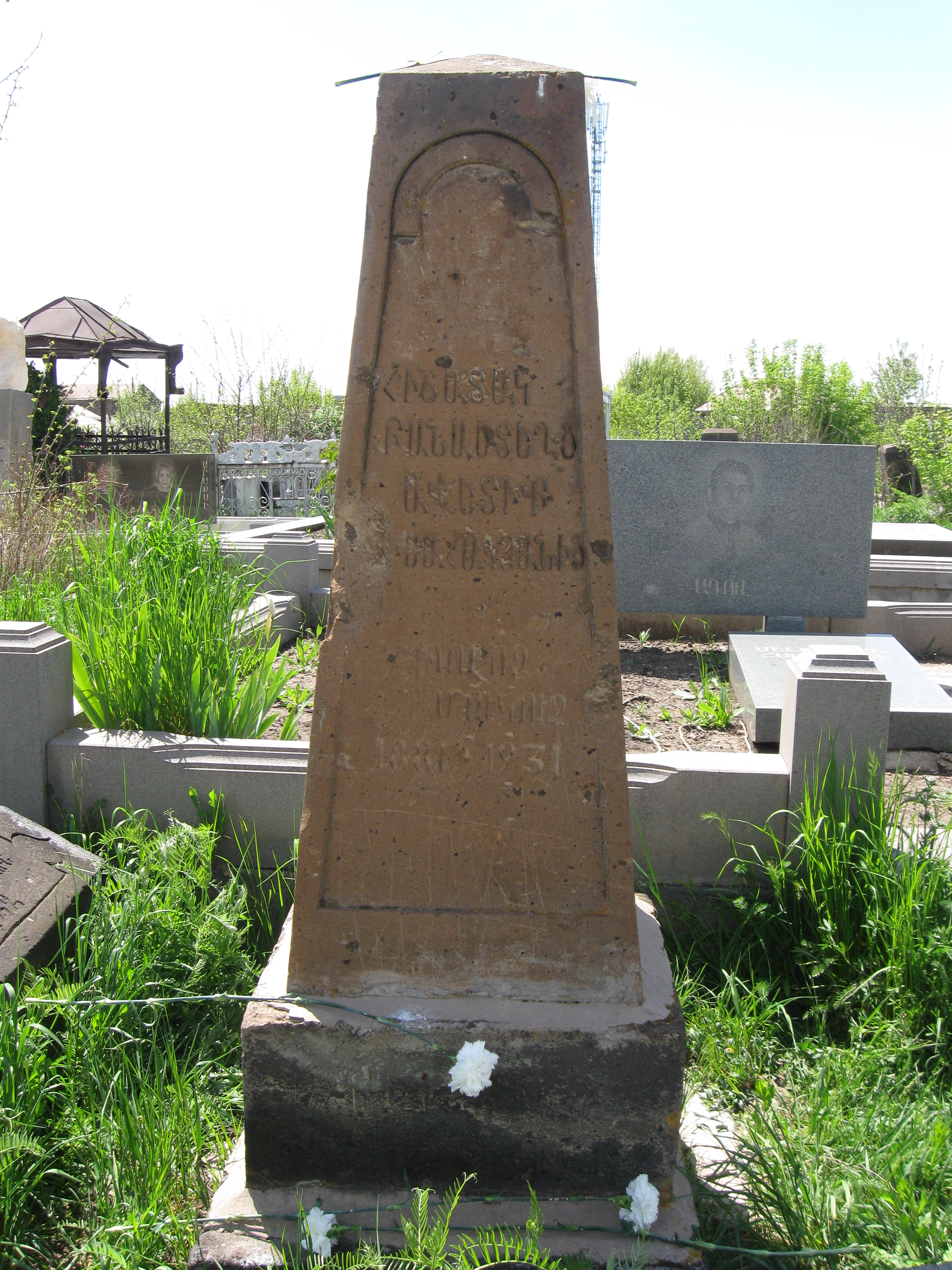
Memorial monument on Poloz Mukuch's grave.

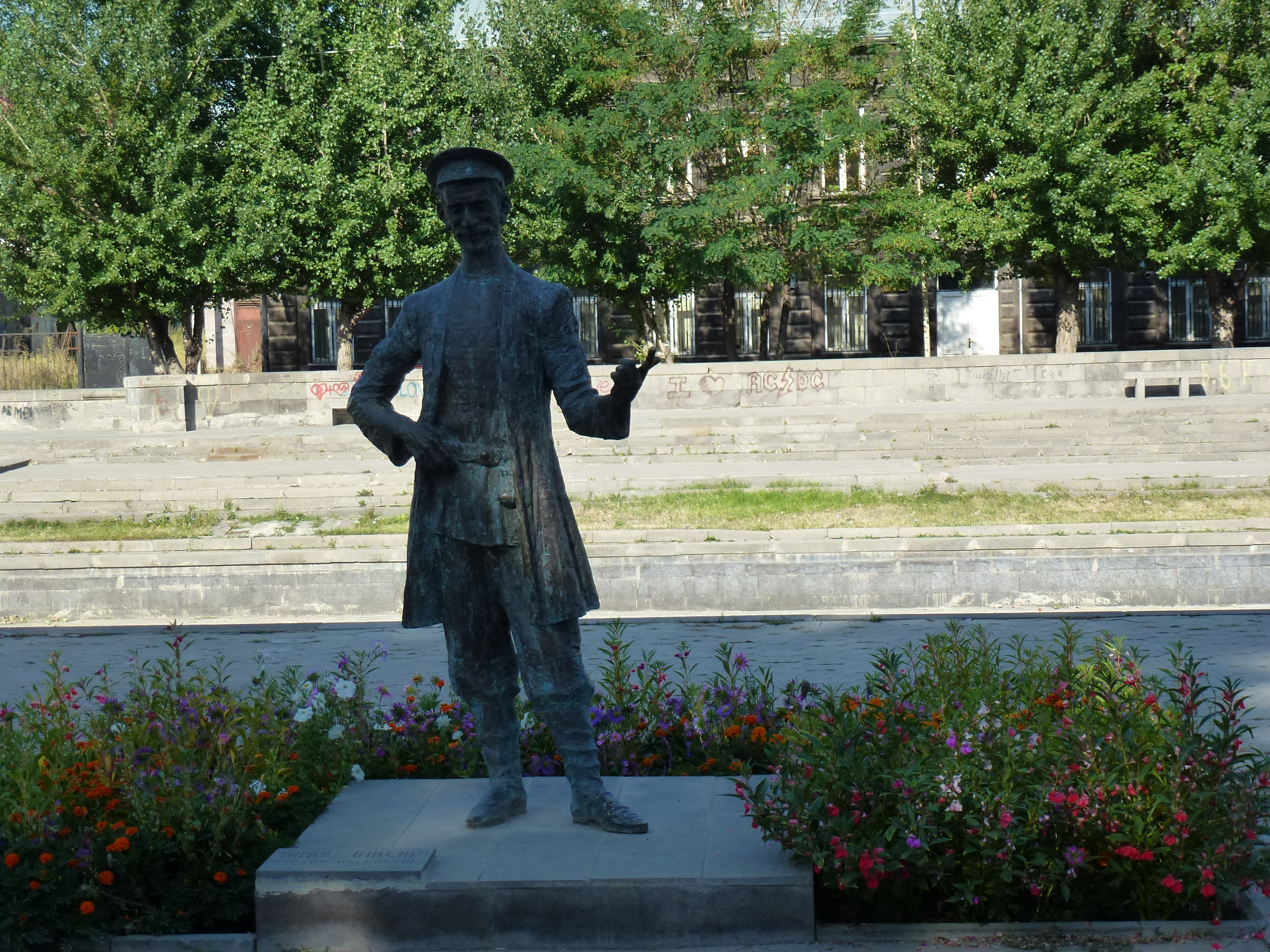
Poloz Mukuch statue in Gyumri

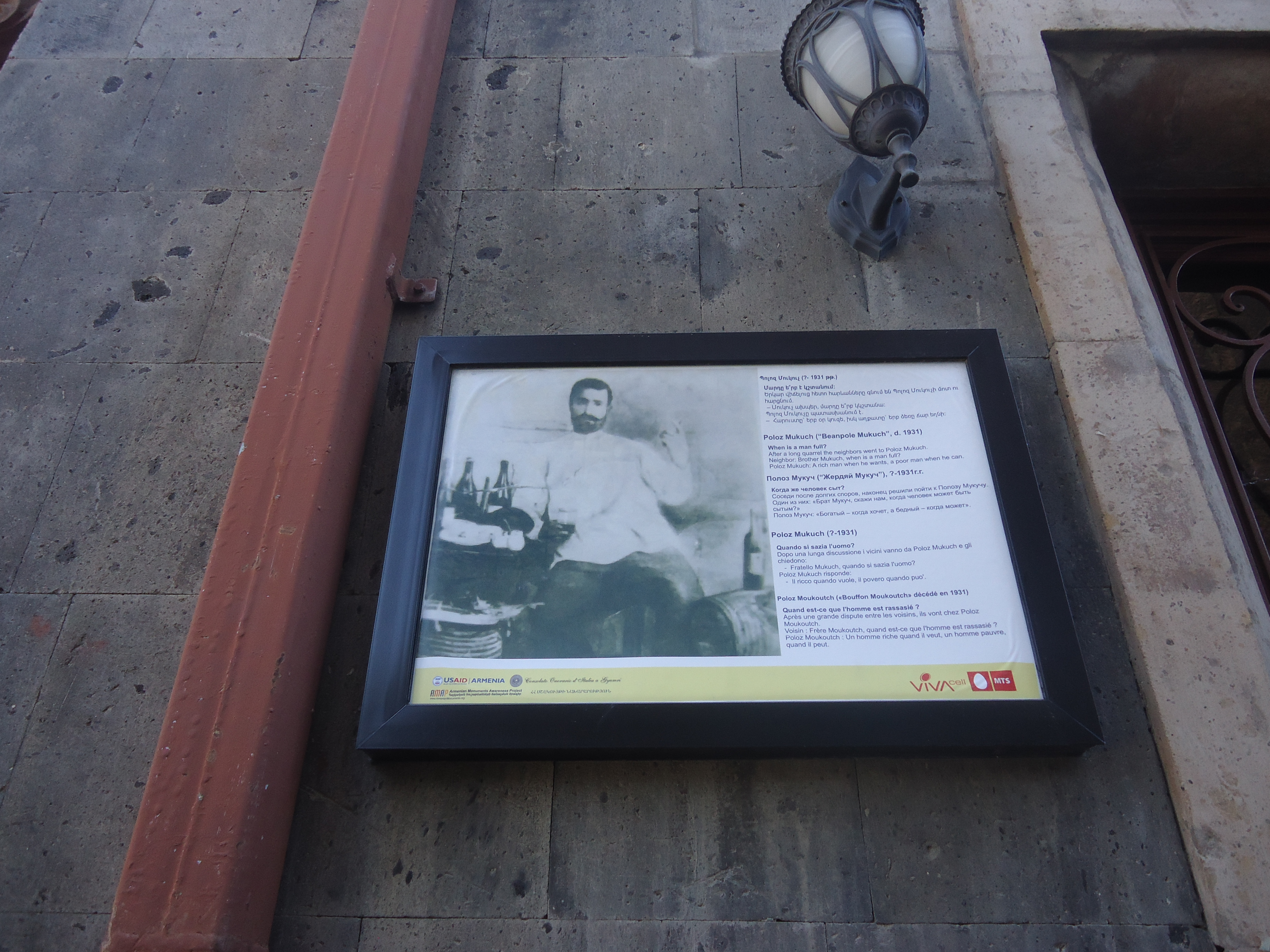
Poloz Mukuch photo on the facade of Poloz Mukuch Beerhouse

== See also ==
- Pele Pughi

== Sources ==
- Հրաչյա Իկիլիկյան, «Գյումրին, Պոլոզ Մուկուչը և երգիծական մանրապատումներ», Երևան, «Հայաստան» հրատ., 1989
