= Pele Pughi =

Armenian satirist and fabulist from Karabakh in the 19c

Pele Pughi Պըլը Պուղի
- Pele Pughi, pencil sketch by Hrachya Rukhyan
- Born: 1731; Avetaranots or Shosh, Safavid Karabakh
- Died: 1810 (aged 78–79); Shosh, Varanda Melikdom, Karabakh Khanate
- Citizenship: Varanda Melikdom
- Occupations: satirist, fabulist, jester

Cover of the book Pele Pughi by Sero Khanzadyan, 1988

Pele Pughi (Armenian: Պըլը Պուղի, lit. 'Paul the Fool'; 1731 – 1810) was an 18th-century Armenian satirist and fabulist from Karabakh.

== Biography ==
Pele Pughi was born in 1731 in either Avetaranots or Shosh in the Melikdom of Varanda, one of the five Armenian principalities of Karabakh. He served as a jester in the court of Melik Shahnazar, the ruler of Varanda Principality. He created funny stories and fables, which, told from mouth to mouth, have been modified and supplemented, reaching modern days under his name. He died in 1810 in Shosh, and is believed to be buried in a cave between Shosh and Mkhitarishen villages, where a memorial monument was erected in 1976.

Despite regretting his behaviour at his dawn, Armenians of Karabakh did not forgive Melik Shahnazar's collaboration with Panah Ali Khan and his hostile treatment the other Armenian meliks, and slammed him with satire via Pughi's character. Although the relationship of Pughi and Shahnazar relationship is presented as one of between jester and ruler, the jester is not an obedient servant but somebody who constantly provokes Melik to do silly things, so he could stand on the right path due to fear of finding himself in laughable situations. Once Melik asks "why does a person's house collapse?", to which Pughi replies "because it happened that the enemy is from inside". Pughi was more than a jester in the melik's court; he was fabulist-adviser, resourceful and fair-minded. In the stories, Pughi is frequently rendered as the archetype of medieval judge who makes wise decisions in difficult cases. Pughi stories, passed from generation to generation, formed one of the important components of Karabakh Armenians' collective humour and leisure, shedding light upon their socio-political and cultural realities from mid-18th century to early 19th century.

== Legacy ==
Bishop Makar Barkhudariants, one of the elders of Karabakh, wrote down 189 Pele Pughi stories and fables and published them in 1883 in Tbilisi under the title Pele Pughi. Later, new records were published by other folklore specialists (S․ Israyelyan, M․ Grigoryan-Spandaryan). Translations, literary modifications and narratives of Pele Pughi's stories have also been published, the most popular being Sero Khanzadyan's Pele Pughi. His stories and fables, serving as fun and banter, have healthy preceptorial, moralistic tendencies, exposing the vicious aspects of everyday life and social relations of his time. Many materials about Pele Pughi are preserved at the Institute of Archeology and Ethnography of the National Academy of Sciences of Armenia, Yeghishe Charents Museum of Literature and Art and elsewhere. Paronyan Musical Comedy Theatre hosted the first act of musical comedy “Artsakh, My Love” or “Pele Pughi” in 2016. Based on Ararat Barseghyan's piece and directed by Gayane Barseghyan, the performance dedicated to 25th anniversary of the independence of the Republic of Armenia. Avo Khalatyan played the role of Pele Pughi. Armenian Centre of PR development is planning to reanimate Pele Pughi, along with Gyumri's Poloz Mukuch, in a new multi-language animated film series, following the example of films about Nasreddin.

== See also ==
- Poloz Mukuch
