= Muhtar =

Muhtar is a Turkish given name and surname derived from Arabic: مختار, romanized: mukhtār, lit. 'chosen one'. Notable persons with that name include:

== Persons with the given name ==
- Muhtar Kent (born 1952), Turkish American businessman
- Ahmet Muhtar Merter (died 1959), Turkish freedom fighter-leader
- Celalettin Muhtar Ozden (1865–1947), Turkish dermatologist
- Ahmed Muhtar Pasha (1839–1919), Turkish Ottoman grand vizier and general
- Ahmet Muhtar Bej Zogolli (1895–1961), eleventh Prime Minister of Albania, first President of Albania, and first fully recognized Albanian king.

== Persons with the surname ==
- Mansur Muhtar (born 1959), Nigerian economist
- Reha Muhtar (born 1959), Turkish television personality

== See also ==
- Mukhtar (disambiguation)
