= Poloz Mukuch Beerhouse =

Coordinates: 40°47′17″N 43°50′18″E

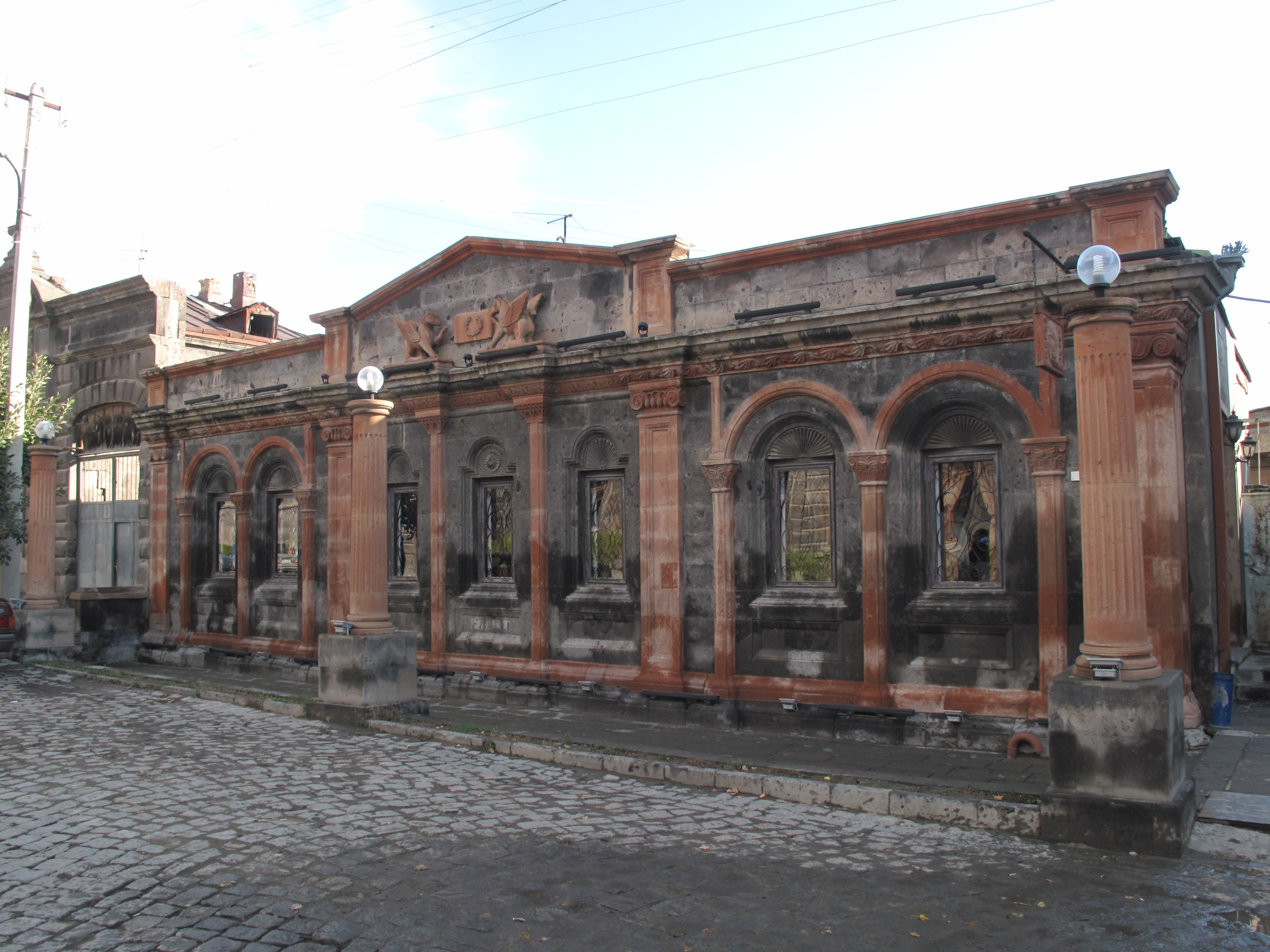
- Poloz Mukuch Beerhouse
- Interactive map of Poloz Mukuch Beerhouse

Restaurant information
- Established: 1960s
- Food type: Armenian
- Location: Jivani Street, Gyumri, Shirak Province, Armenia

Poloz Mukuch is a restaurant and prominent beerhouse in Gyumri, the second-largest city in Armenia. It was opened during the 1960s in Soviet Armenia and located in the historic district of Kumayri. It occupies an old mansion built in the 1860s. The beerhouse is named after humorist Mkrtich Melkonyan (1881-1931), a native of Gyumri, better known as Poloz Mukuch.

== History ==
The building was built by Ter-Suqias Meliqyan (born in 1880 in Ojakhuli when Gyumri was known as Alexandropol in Imperial Russia). The property was nationalized by the Soviet government in 1937 following the execution of Meliqyan by the NKVD (People's Committee of Internal Affairs). At the beginning of the 1960s, the building was turned into a state-owned beerhouse.

However, the property was privatized in late 1990s and continued to function as a beerhouse. The 130-year old building is well-preserved and still keeping its original traditional design. A bust of Poloz Mukuch has been placed at the entrance.

Nowadays, the beerhouse is one of the prominent landmarks of the city of Gyumri.

== Gallery ==
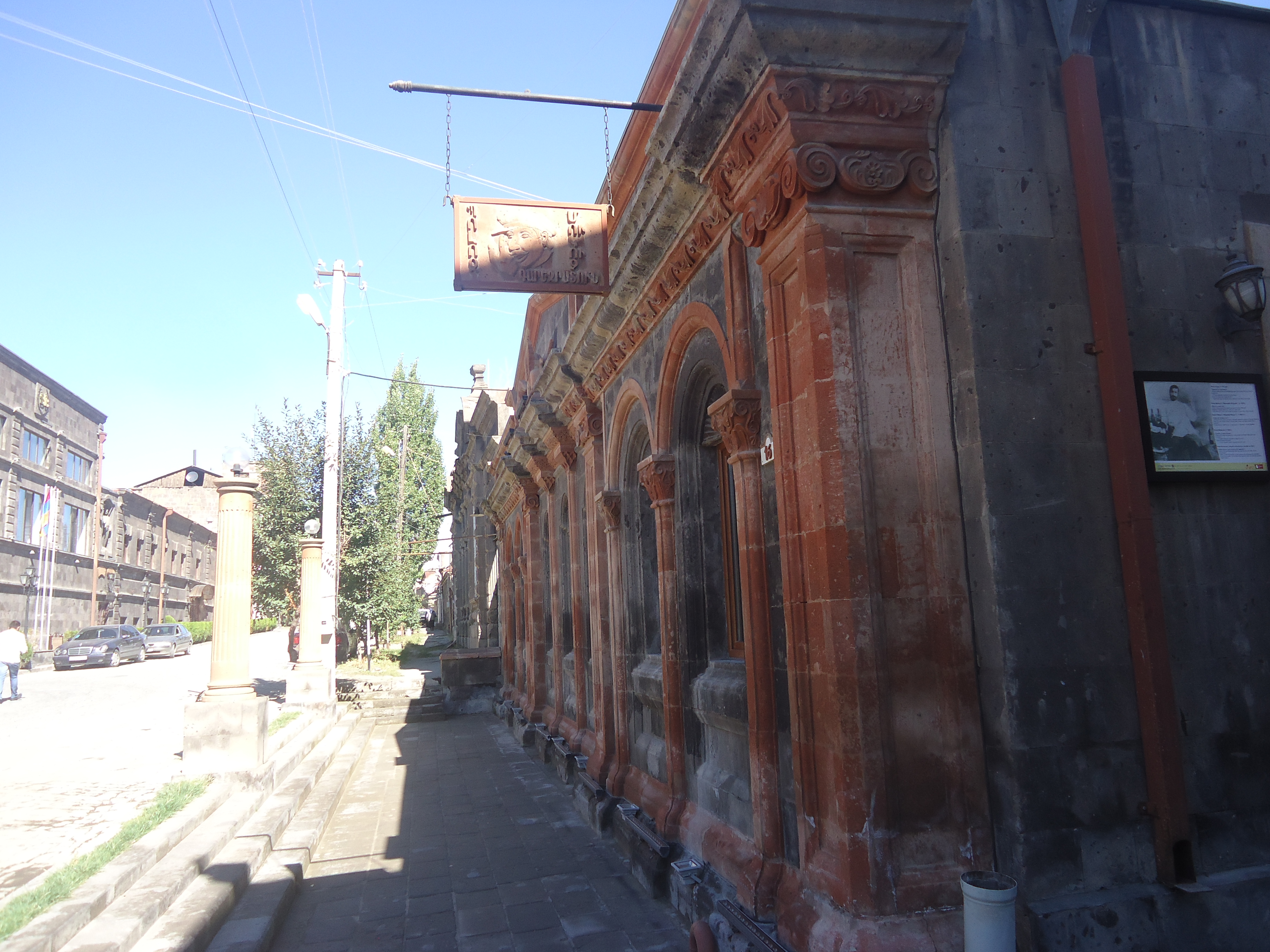
The beerhouse at Kumayri historic district

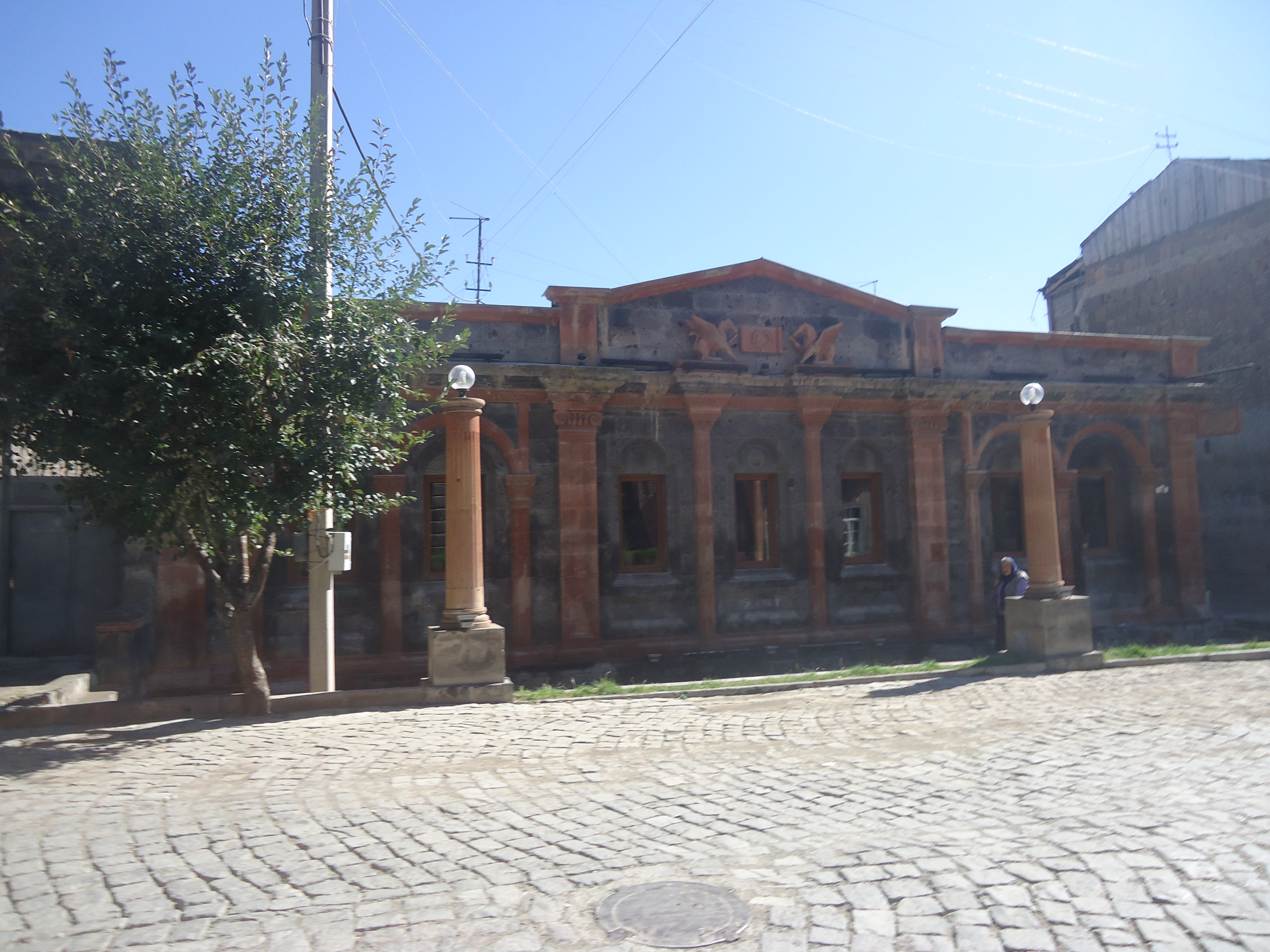
The facade of the building

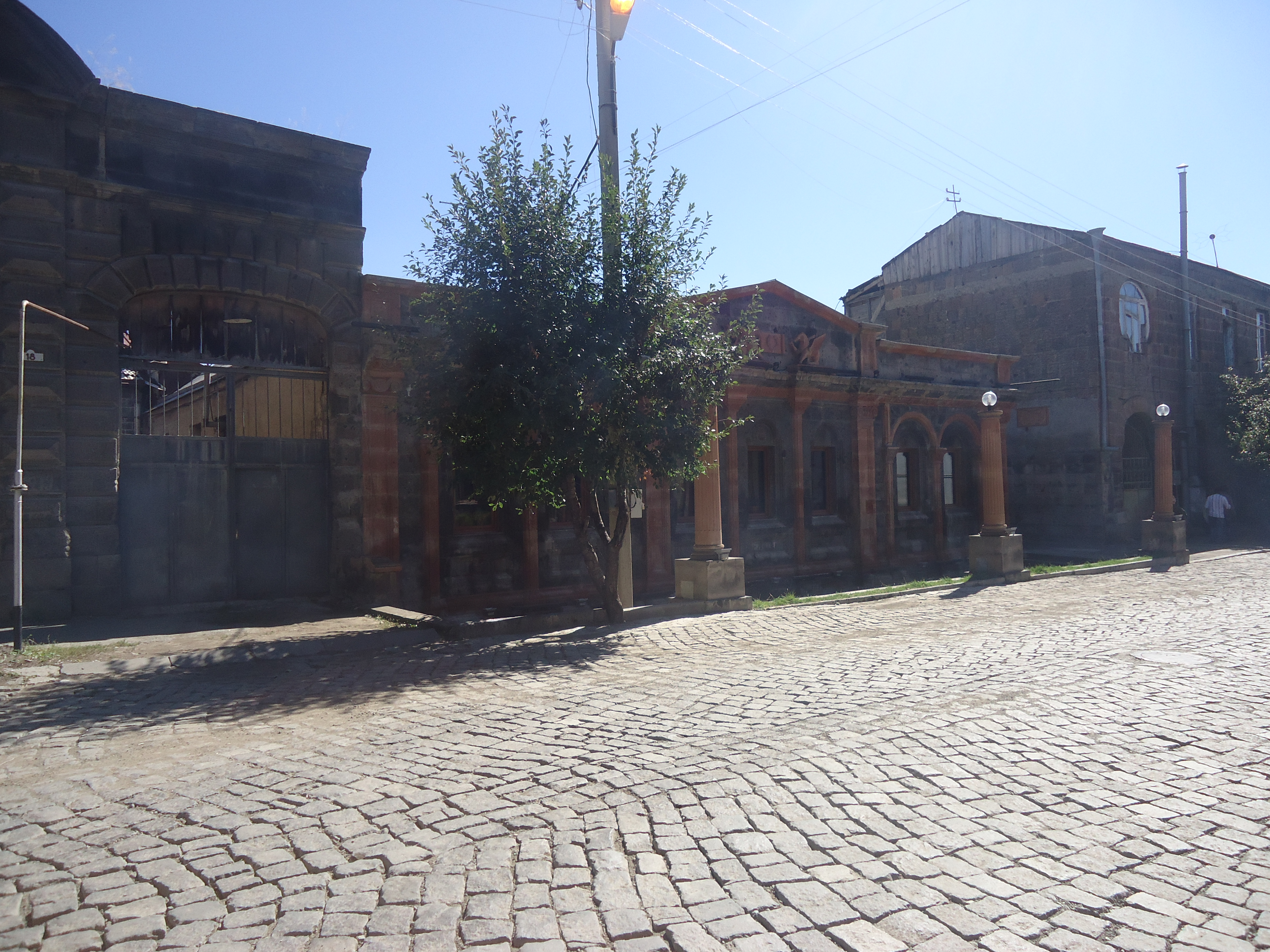
General view

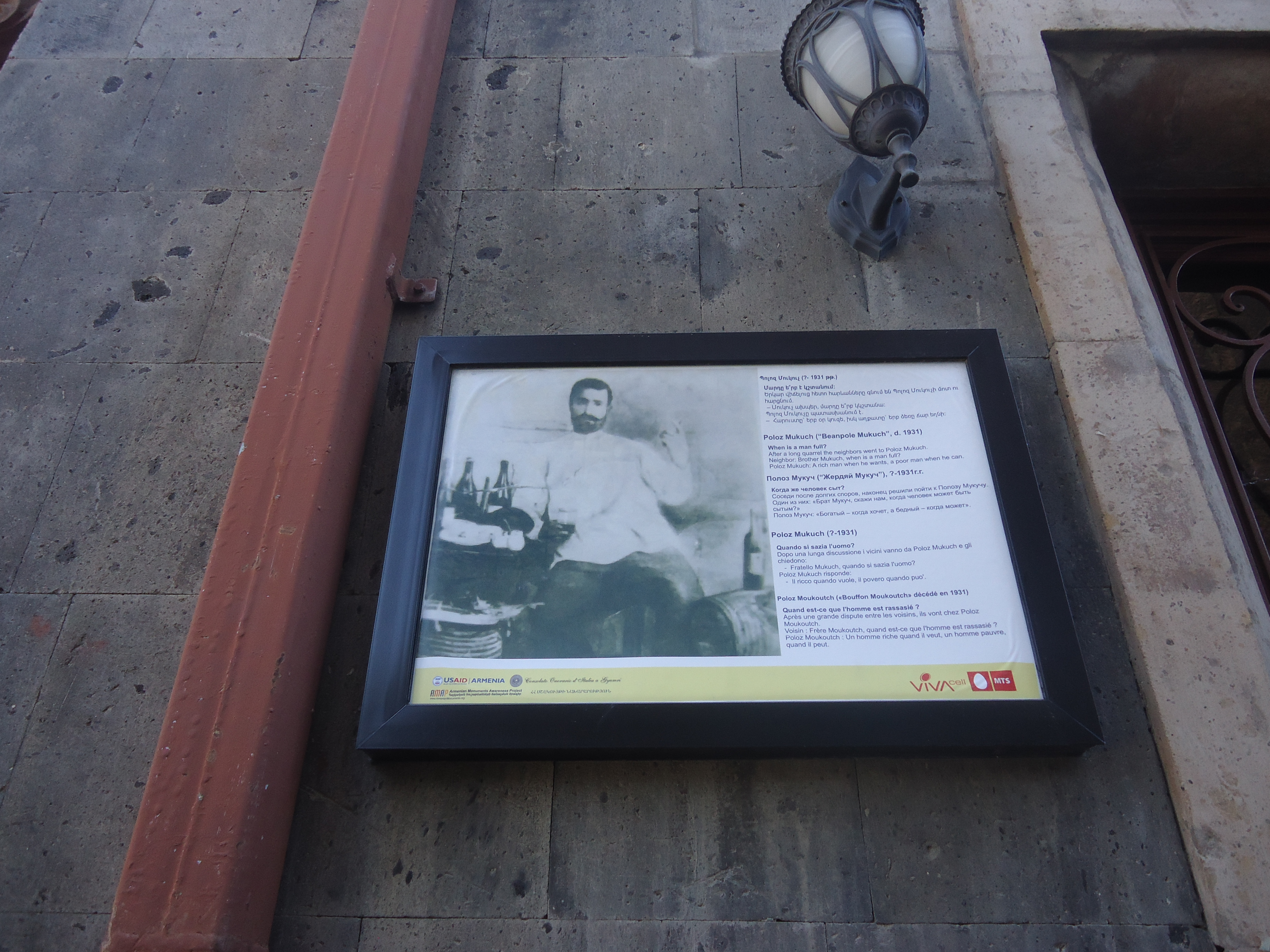
Mkrtich Melkonyan, better known as Poloz Mukuch

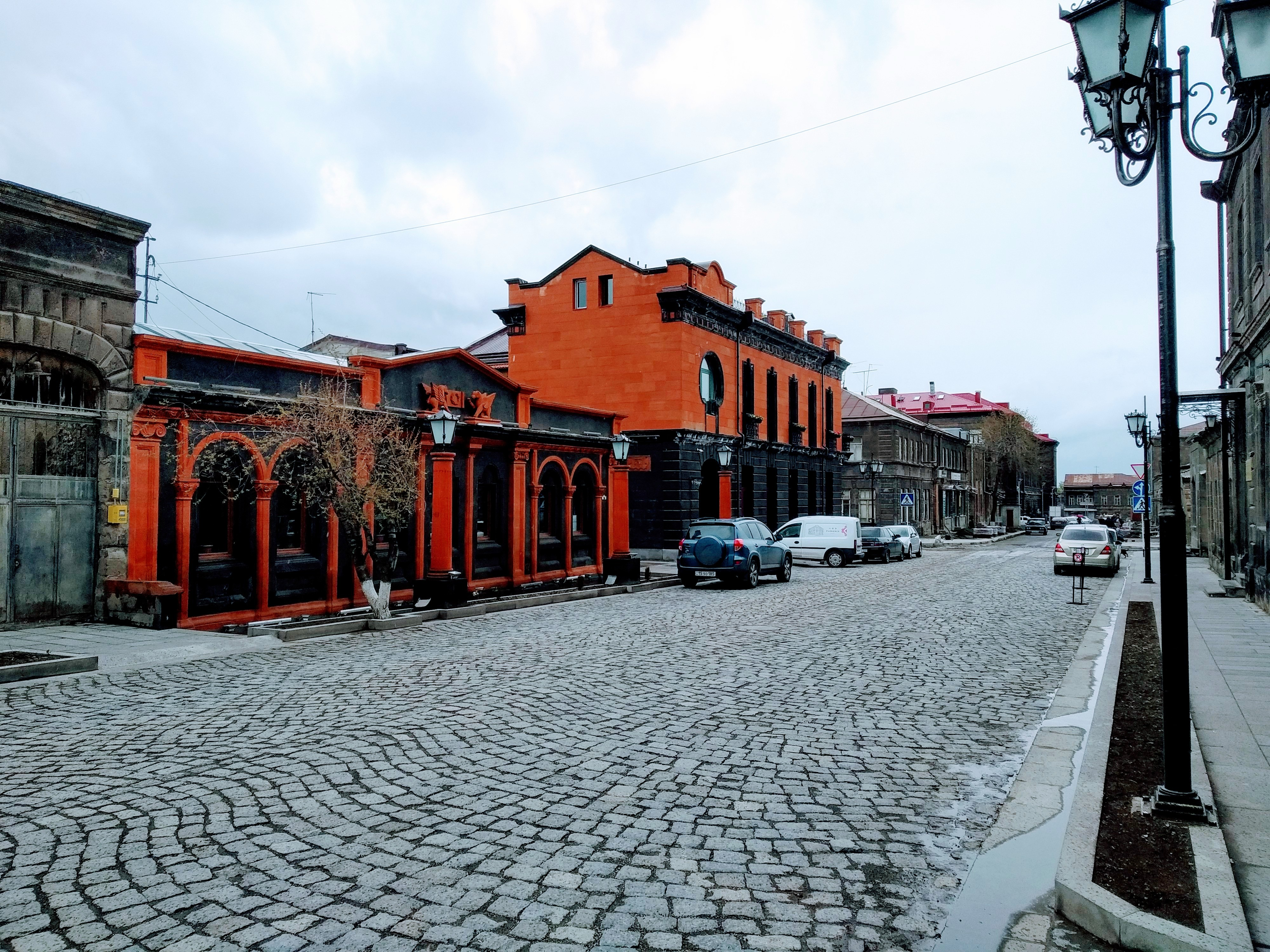
The beerhouse at Jivani Street
