= Sero Khanzadyan =

Soviet-Armenian writer and novelist

Sero Khanzadyan Սերո Խանզադյան
- Born: December 3, 1915; Goris, Elisabethpol Governorate, Russian Empire
- Died: June 26, 1998 (aged 82); Yerevan, Armenia
- Occupation: Novelist

Sero Nikolayi Khanzadyan (Armenian: Սերո Նիկոլայի Խանզադյան, December 3 [O.S. November 20], 1915 – June 26, 1998) was a Soviet and Armenian writer and novelist.

== Early life and education ==
Sero Khanzadyan was born in 1915 to a peasant family in the town of Goris located in the district of Zangezur (modern-day Syunik Province of Armenia). In 1934 he graduated from the Goris Pedagogical Technicum and worked as a schoolteacher for several years.

== Life and works ==
Sero Khanzadyan published his first short story, titled Chor tapě ("The Dry Field"), in 1934 in the newspaper Karmir Zangezur. In 1938 he wrote a play titled Vardan Vorotanetsi about a 10th-century peasant revolt in Syunik, which was first performed in 1940.

Khanzadyan joined the Red Army and fought in World War II, serving on the Volkhov and Leningrad fronts. He rose to the rank of captain in a mortar company in the 261st Rifle Regiment. In 1950 he published his first novel, Mer gndi mardik ("The Men of Our Regiment") dedicated to the defense of Leningrad. Drawing from his personal combat experience, he later wrote the novel Yerek tari, 291 or ("Three Years, 291 Days"). Published in 1972, it became one of the most prominent works in Soviet military fiction literature at the time.

One of the main ideas Khanzadyan promoted in his work was that the Armenians should fight shoulder to shoulder with the Russians, Ukrainians and other nationalities to protect their motherland. His two-volume novel Hoghě ("The Soil"), published in 1954–55, tells the story of villagers in the post-war period.

Khanzadyan often drew attention to the centuries-long relationship between Armenians and Russians in his works. Later on he would use this idea in his historical novel Mkhitar Sparapet (1961) and other works. In an interview, Khanzadyan stated that he came up with the idea of writing the story about Mkhitar Sparapet and Davit Bek, two early 18th-century Armenian rebel commanders, while he was still away at war. In Mkhitar Sparapet, as elsewhere, the idea of the strong friendship between the Armenian and Russian people is placed at the center of the story. The work "Horovel" is a hymn to the strong will of a peasant, stubbornly following the path of plough despite the pain and thirst.

Besides the war, Sero Khanzadyan also wrote about the Armenian genocide, including his novel, Six Nights. Khanzadyan also wrote about the life of the eighteenth-century Karabakh Armenian jester and folk collector Pele Pughi.

In 1977, Khanzadyan wrote an open letter to Soviet leader Leonid Brezhnev calling for Nagorno-Karabakh's annexation to Soviet Armenia.

Khanzadyan died in 1998. He is buried at the Komitas Pantheon in Yerevan.

== Legacy ==
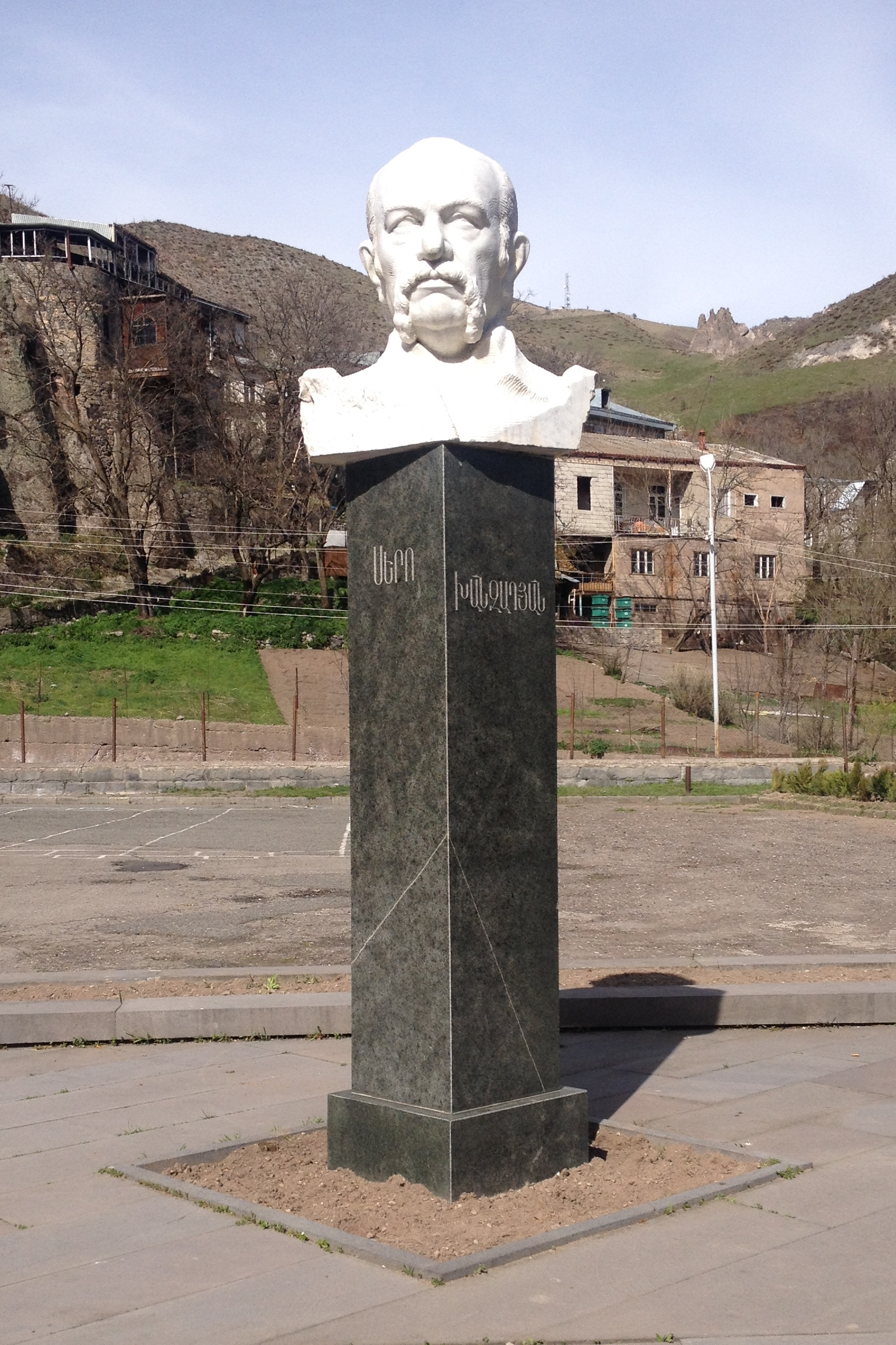
Monument to Khanzadyan in Goris

Sero Khanzadyan left a great legacy in the field of Armenian literature, which was inspired by Soviet notions and ideas of internationalism, strong ties with the folk culture and tradition. In his works he defends the ideals of humanism and love for one's homeland. In his latest years of his life, during an interview given to the Public TV of Armenia, he strongly criticized Bolshevik nationalities policy in the early 1920s and the decision to attach the regions of Nagorno-Karabakh and Nakhchivan to Soviet Azerbaijan.

== Awards ==
- Hero of Socialist Labour (16.11.1984)
- Order of Lenin (16.11.1984)
- Order of the Patriotic War 1st degree (11.03.1985)
- Order of the Patriotic War 2nd degree (11.04.1945)
- Two Order of the Red Banner of Labour (27.06.1956; 04.12.1975)
- Order of the Red Star (19.03.1944)
- Order of the Badge of Honour (02.12.1965)
- State Prize of the Armenian SSR (1977)
- Honored Cultural Worker of the Armenian SSR (1972)
- Honorary Citizen of Yerevan (1985)

== Works ==
- Mer gndi mardik [The Men of Our Regiment] (1950)
- Hoghě [The Soil], vols. 1-2 (1954–1955)
- Karmir shushanner [Red Lilies] (1958)
- Karandzavi bnakichnerě [The Inhabitants of the Cave] (1959)
- Mkhitar sparapet (1961)
- Korats arahetner [Lost Paths] (1964)
- Kajaran (1965)
- Matyan yeghelutyants [Book of Events] (1966)
- Yerkeri zhoghovatsu [Collected Works], vols. 1-5 (1967–1970)
- Andzrevits heto [After the Rain] (1969)
- Inchu, inchu [Why, Why?] (collection of short stories, 1970)
- Yerek tari, 291 or [Three years, 291 days] (1972)
- Sevani lusabatsě [Sevan's Sunrise] (1975)
- Khosek, Hayastani lerner [Speak, Mountains of Armenia] (1976)
- Taguhin hayots [The Queen of Armenia] (1978)
- 1971, amar [1971, Summer] (short stories, novella and play, 1979)
- Hayrenapatum, vols. 1–5, (1980–1988)
- Yerkeri zhoghovatsu [Collected Works], vols. 1-6 (1981–1983)
- Araksě pghtorvum e [The Aras Becomes Murky] (1985)
- Hors het yev arants hors [With My Father and Without My Father] (1986)
- Avandatun [Sacristry] (1986)
- Inchpes hishum em [How I Remember] (1988)
- Pělě Pughi (1988)
- Andranik (1989)
- Shushi (1991)
- Gareghin Nzhdeh (1993)
- Gharabaghě krakneri mej [Karabakh in Flames] (2006)

== Bibliography ==
- Hayryan, G. (1979). "Khanzadyan Sero Nikolayi". In Hambardzumyan, Viktor (ed.). Soviet Armenian Encyclopedia (in Armenian). Vol. 5. Yerevan. p. 12.
