= Shosh, Nagorno-Karabakh =

Shosh / Shushikend Շոշ / Şuşikənd
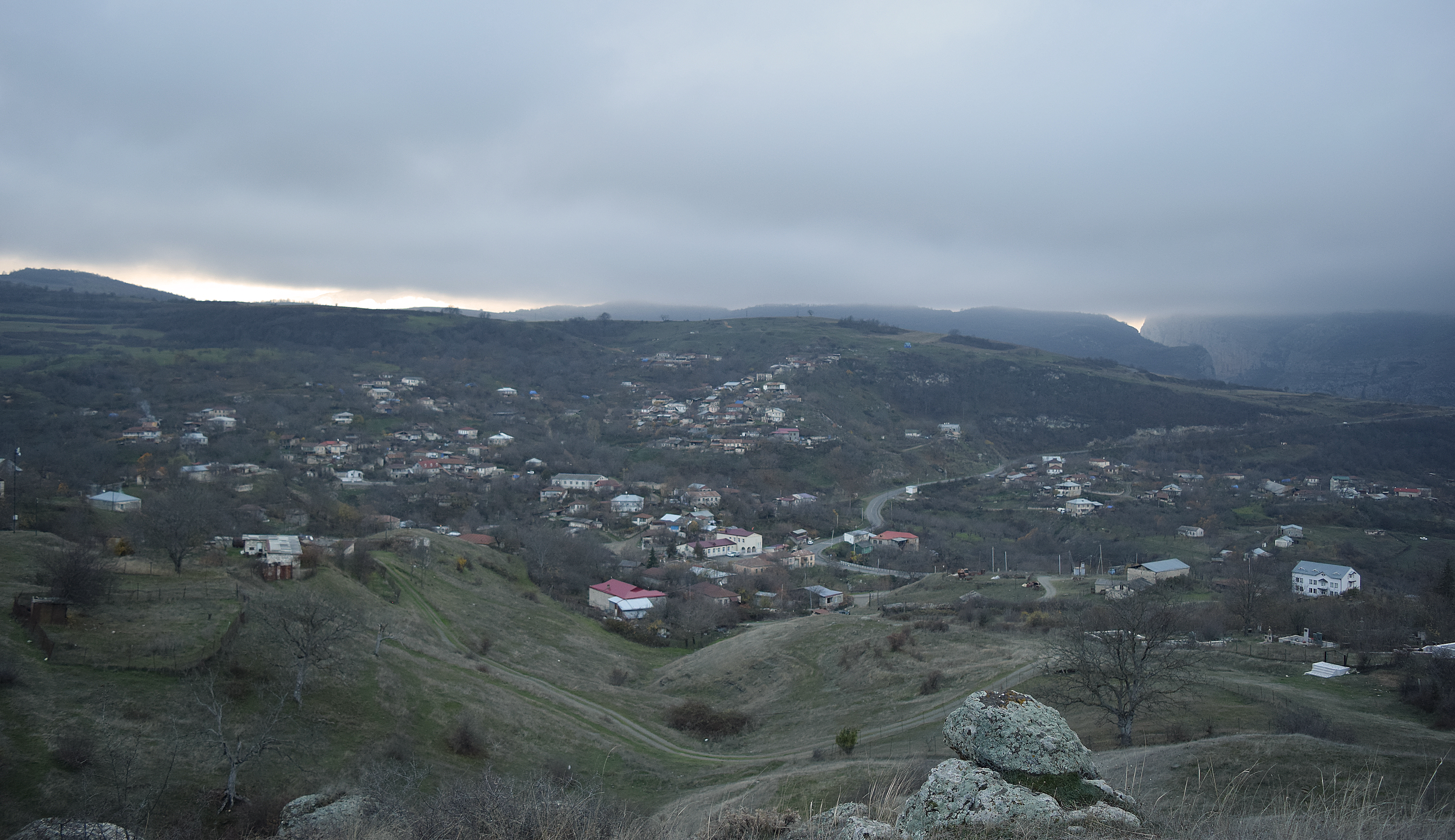

- Location within Azerbaijan Location within Karabakh Economic Region
- Coordinates: 39°46′12″N 46°47′05″E
- Country: Azerbaijan
  - District: Khojaly
- Elevation: 1,024 m (3,360 ft)

Population (2015)
  - Total: 641
- Time zone: UTC+4 (AZT)

Shosh (Armenian: Շոշ) or Shushikend (Armenian: Շուշիքենդ; Azerbaijani: Şuşikənd, Russian: Шушике́нд) is a village in the Khojaly District of Azerbaijan, in the region of Nagorno-Karabakh. Until 2023 it was controlled by the breakaway Republic of Artsakh. The village had an ethnic Armenian-majority population until the expulsion of the Armenian population of Nagorno-Karabakh by Azerbaijan following the 2023 Azerbaijani offensive in Nagorno-Karabakh.

== History ==
Shosh's name and history is connected to that of Shusha (Shushi), which is located a short distance from the village. The Armenian historian Leo considered it likely that the village Shosh received its name from Shushi, which he considered the older settlement, although some sources say that Shushi received its name from the village.

During the Soviet period, the village was part of the Askeran District of the Nagorno-Karabakh Autonomous Oblast. The village has been administered by the Republic of Artsakh since the First Nagorno-Karabakh War.

After the 2020 Nagorno-Karabakh war, five Armenian families displaced from Vazgenashen (Gulably) settled in the village, as well as in Ivanyan (Khojaly).

== Historical heritage sites ==
There are three Armenian churches in the village, the 19th-century church of Surb Astvatsatsin (Armenian: Սուրբ Աստվածածին, lit. 'Holy Mother of God') in the village centre, St. Stephen's Church (Armenian: Սուրբ Ստեփանոս եկեղեցի, romanized: Surb Stepanos Yekeghetsi) built in 1655 on the village cemetery grounds, and above the village on a hill in the north, there is a church with an adjacent cemetery with khachkars. The 19th-century chapel of Karmir Taran (Armenian: Կարմիր Տարան) is also located in the village. Other historical heritage sites in and around the village include the medieval shrine of Shoghasar (Armenian: Շողասար), a 17th-century khachkar, the 18th-century bridge of Dzakhlik (Armenian: Ձախլիկ), and a 19th-century watermill. A monument in honor of the 18th-century Armenian satirist and fabulist Pele Pughi was built in 1976 between Shosh and Mkhitarashen.

== Economy and culture ==
The population is mainly engaged in agriculture and animal husbandry. As of 2015, the village has a municipal building, a house of culture, a secondary school, four shops, and a medical centre.

== Demographics ==
The village had 544 inhabitants in 2005, and 641 inhabitants in 2015.

== Notable people ==
- Arsen Terteryan (1882-1953) – Soviet Armenian scientist and writer
- Pele Pughi (1731-1810) – Armenian satirist and fabulist

== Gallery ==
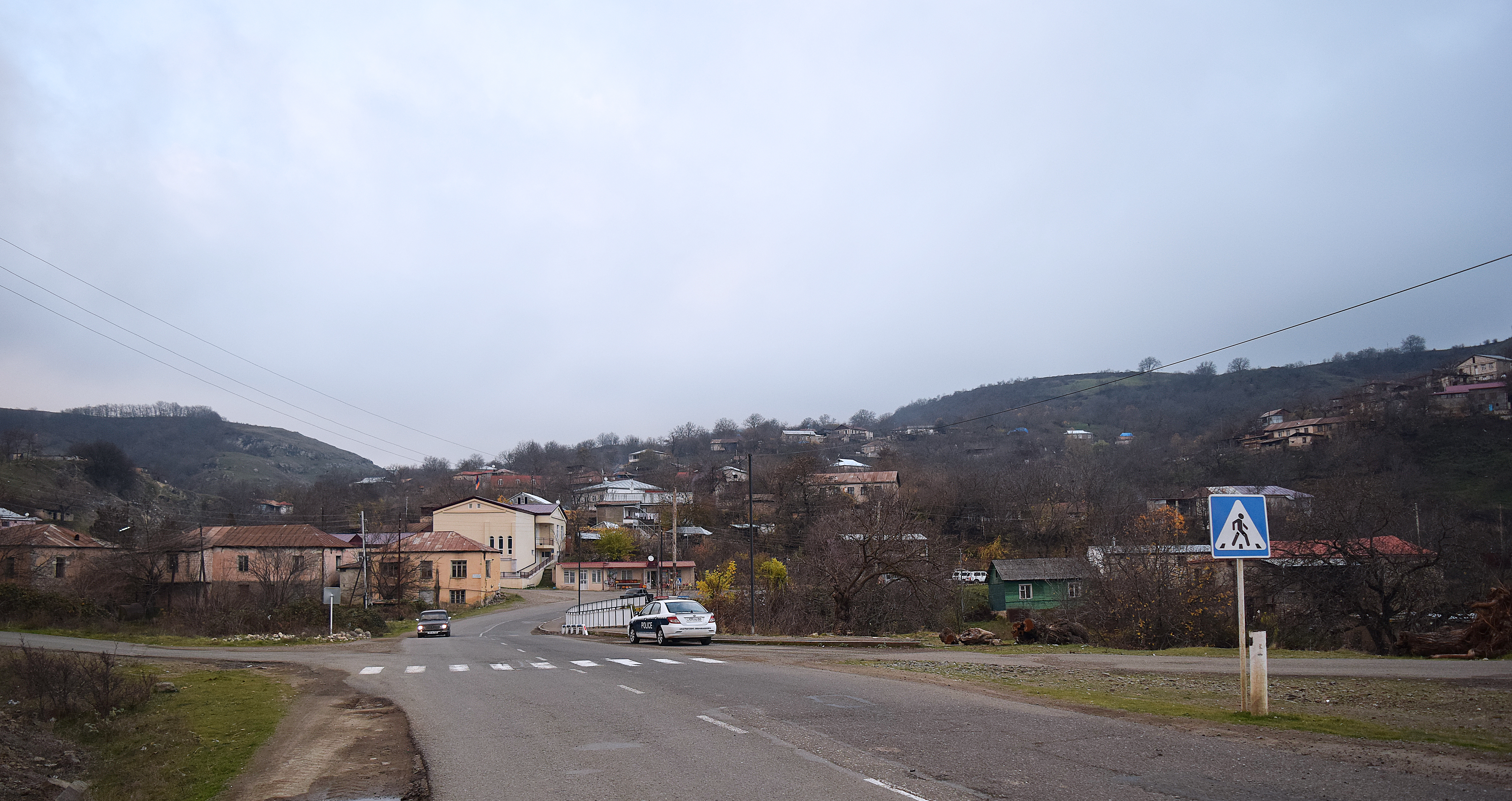
A view of the village

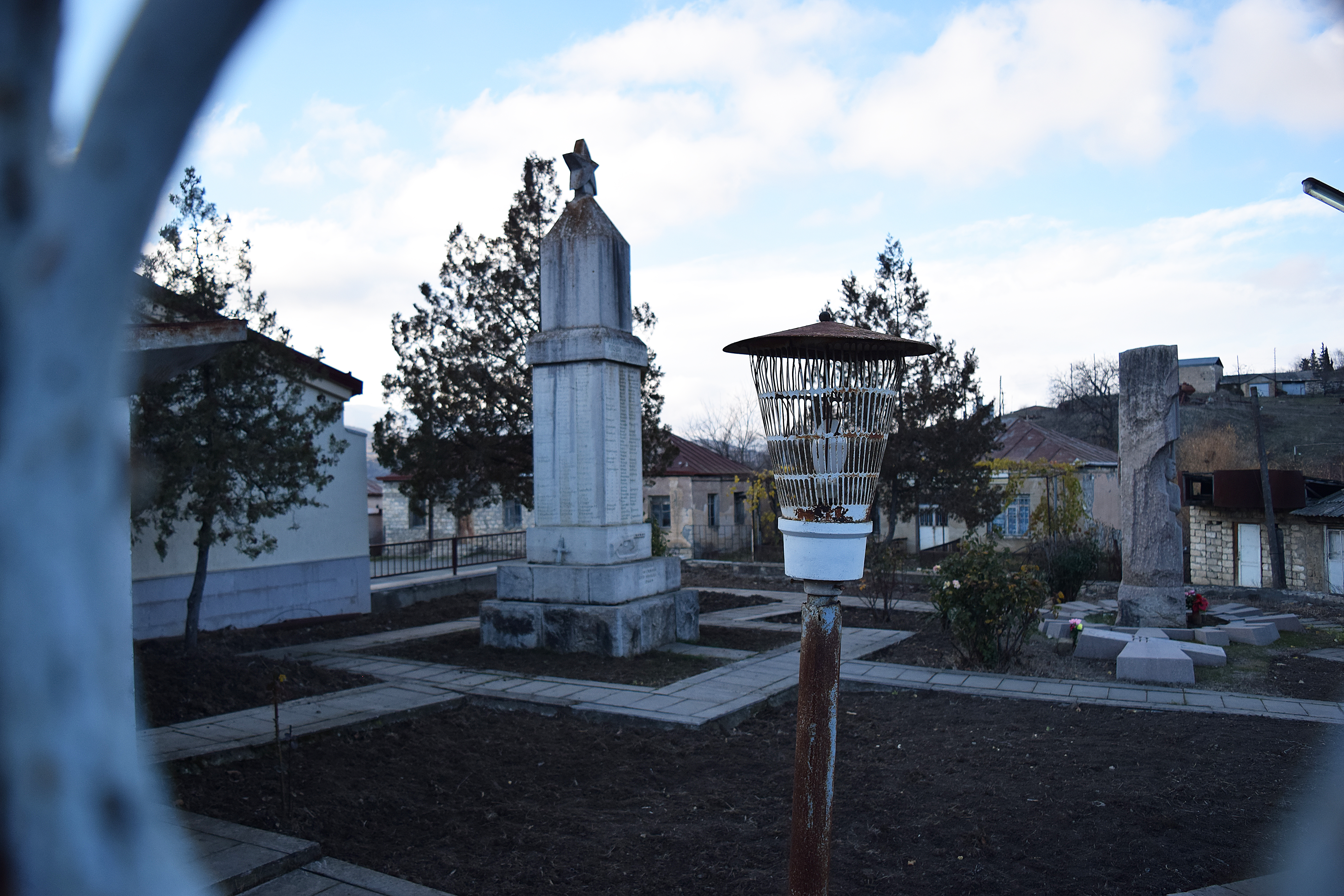
WWII memorial

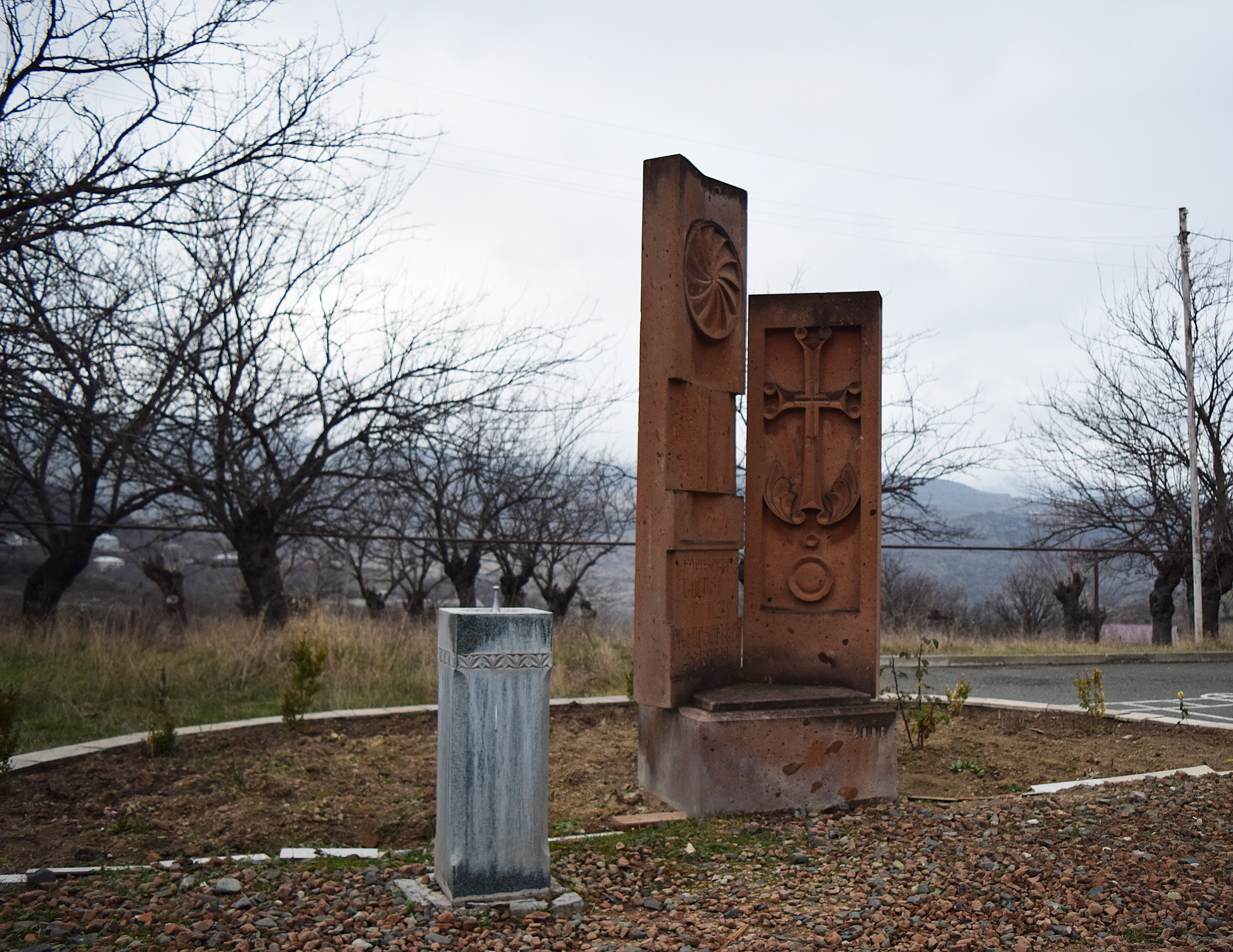
Khachkar

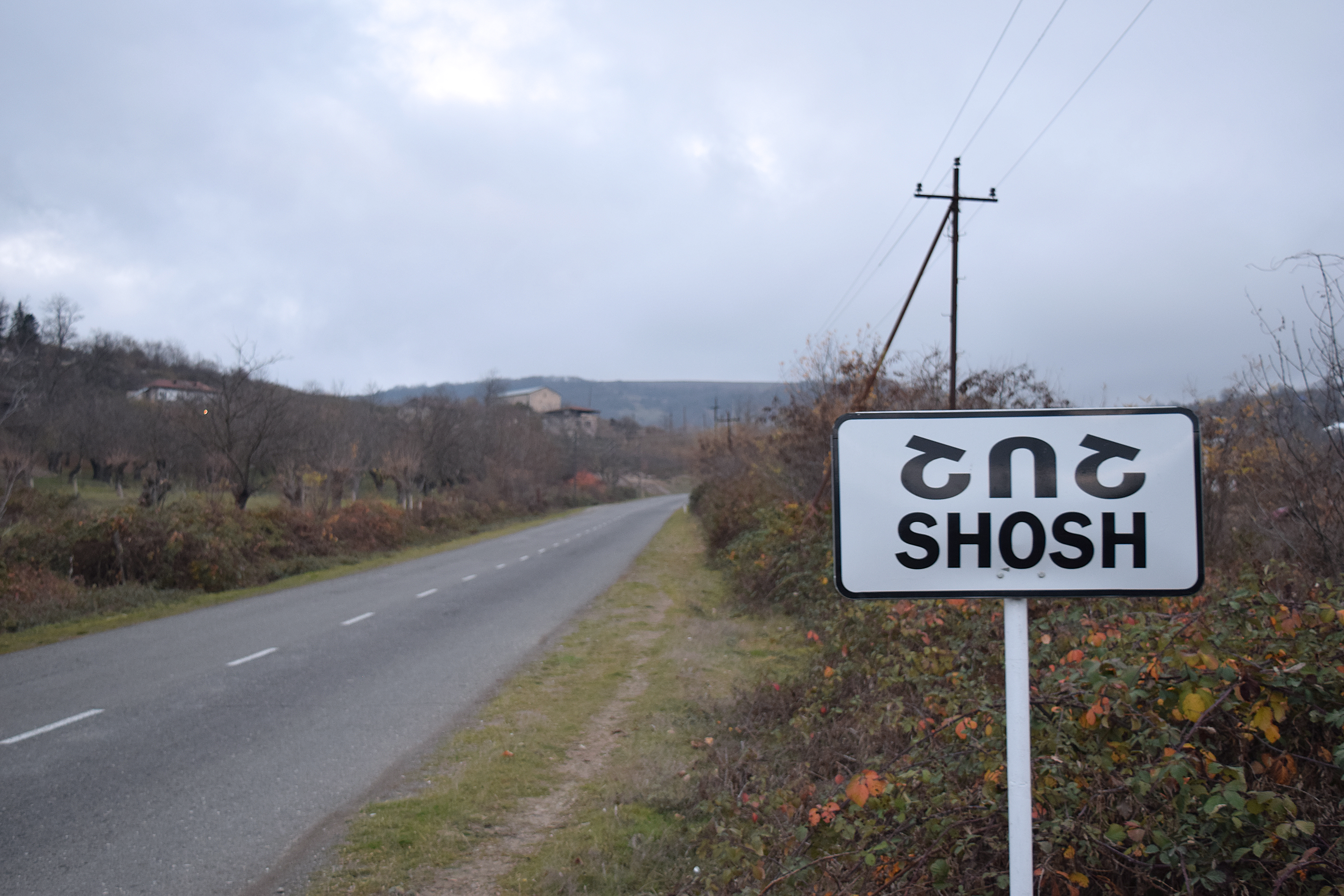
Sign reading "Shosh" in Armenian and Latin characters

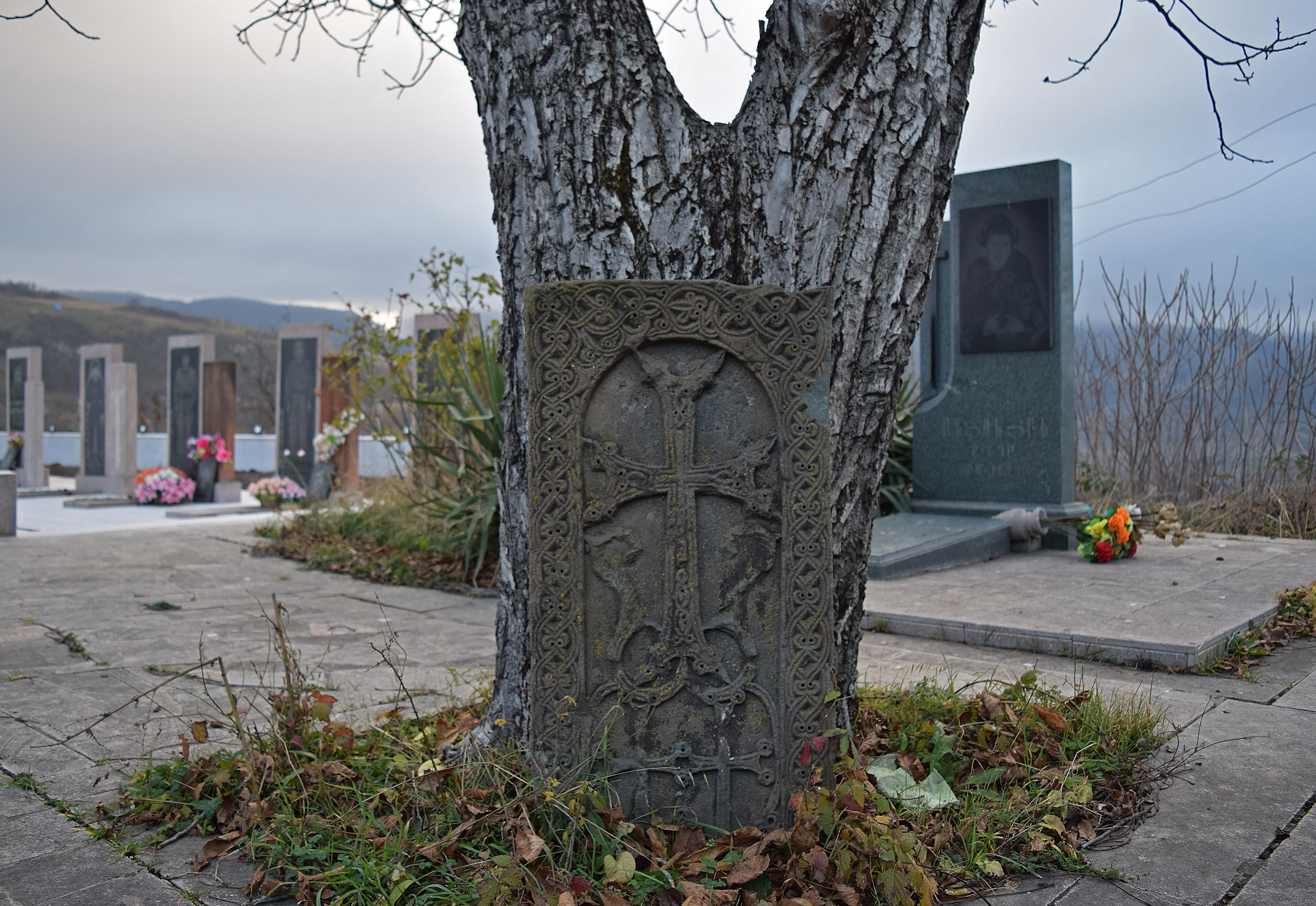
Cemetery

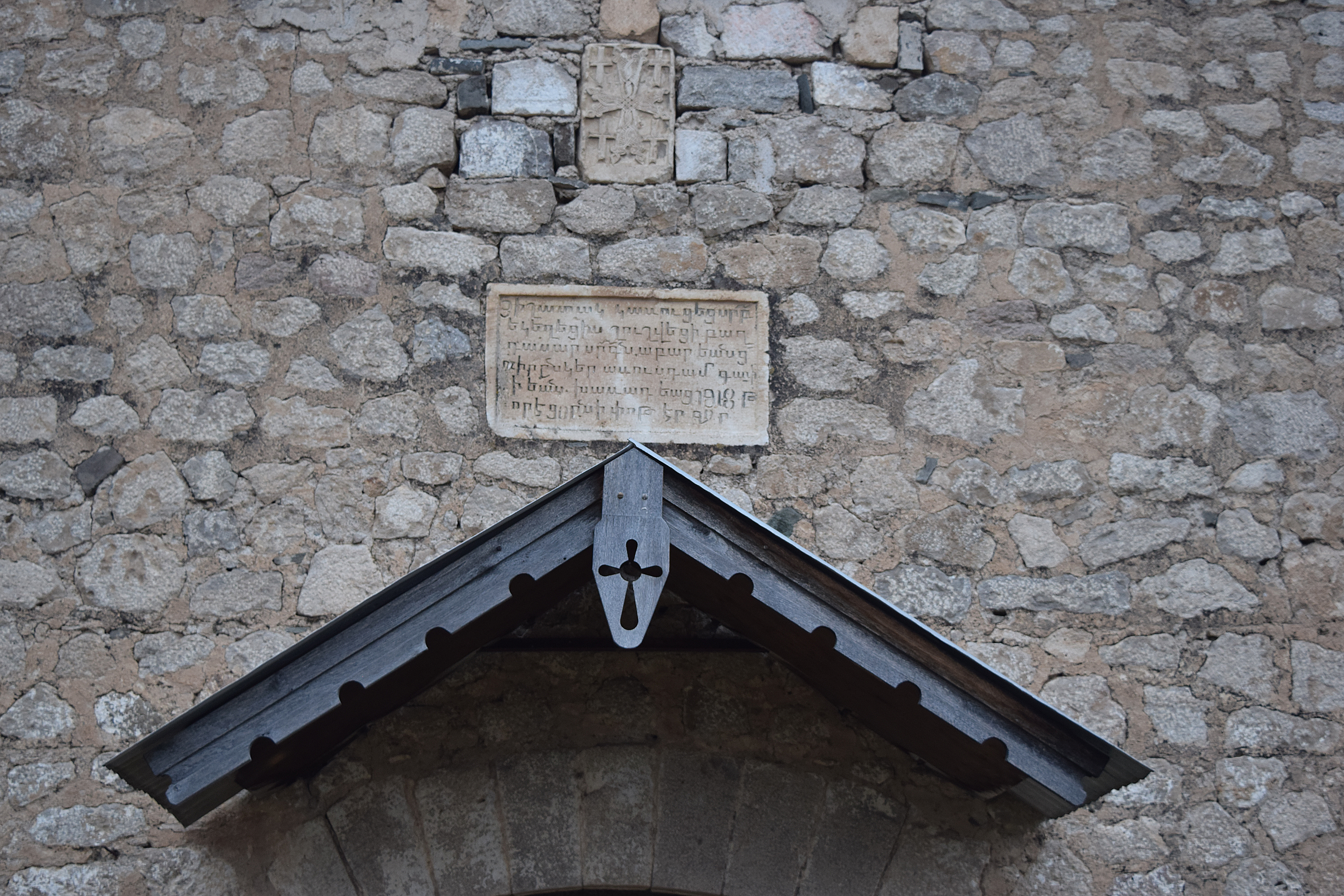
Village church

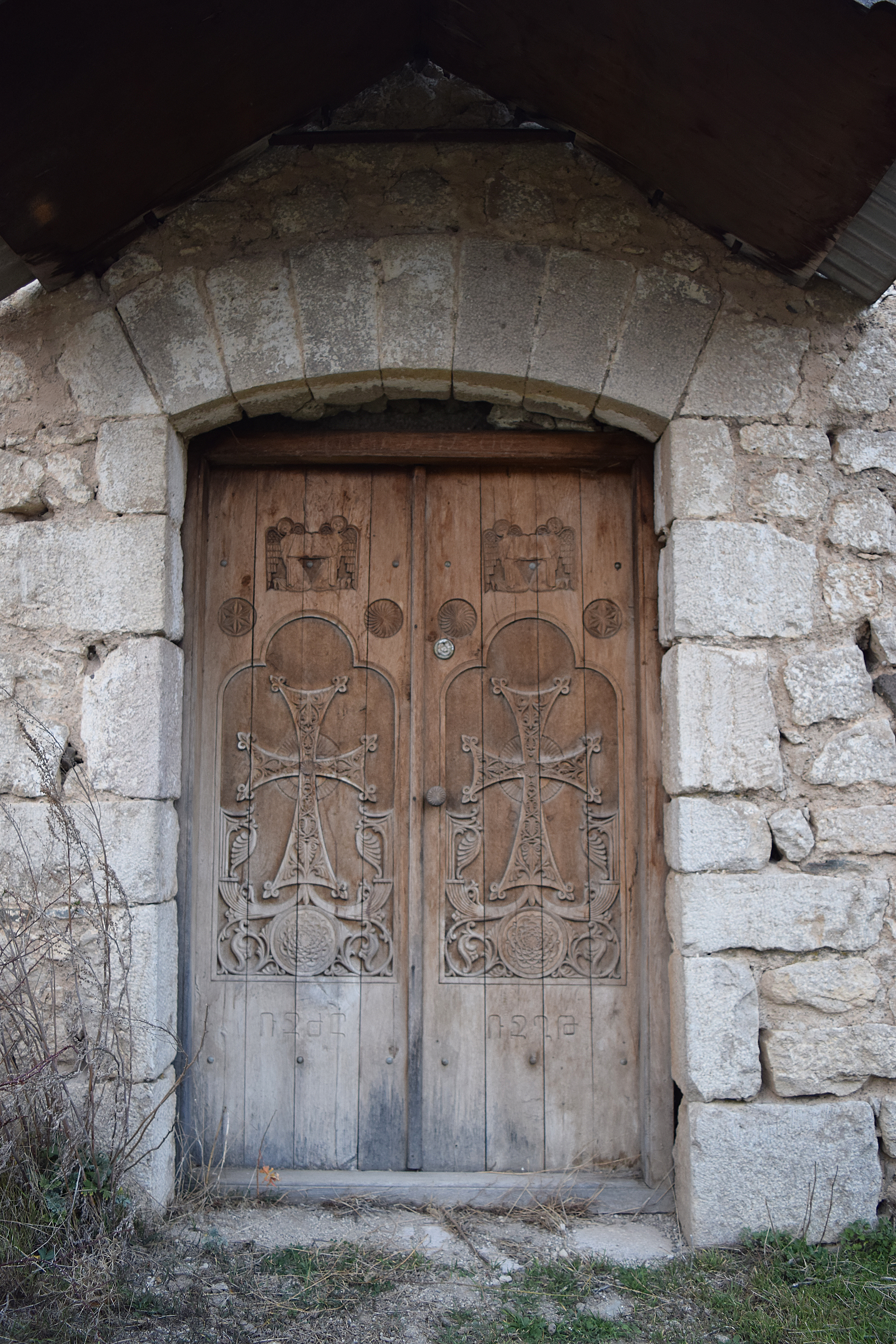
Church door

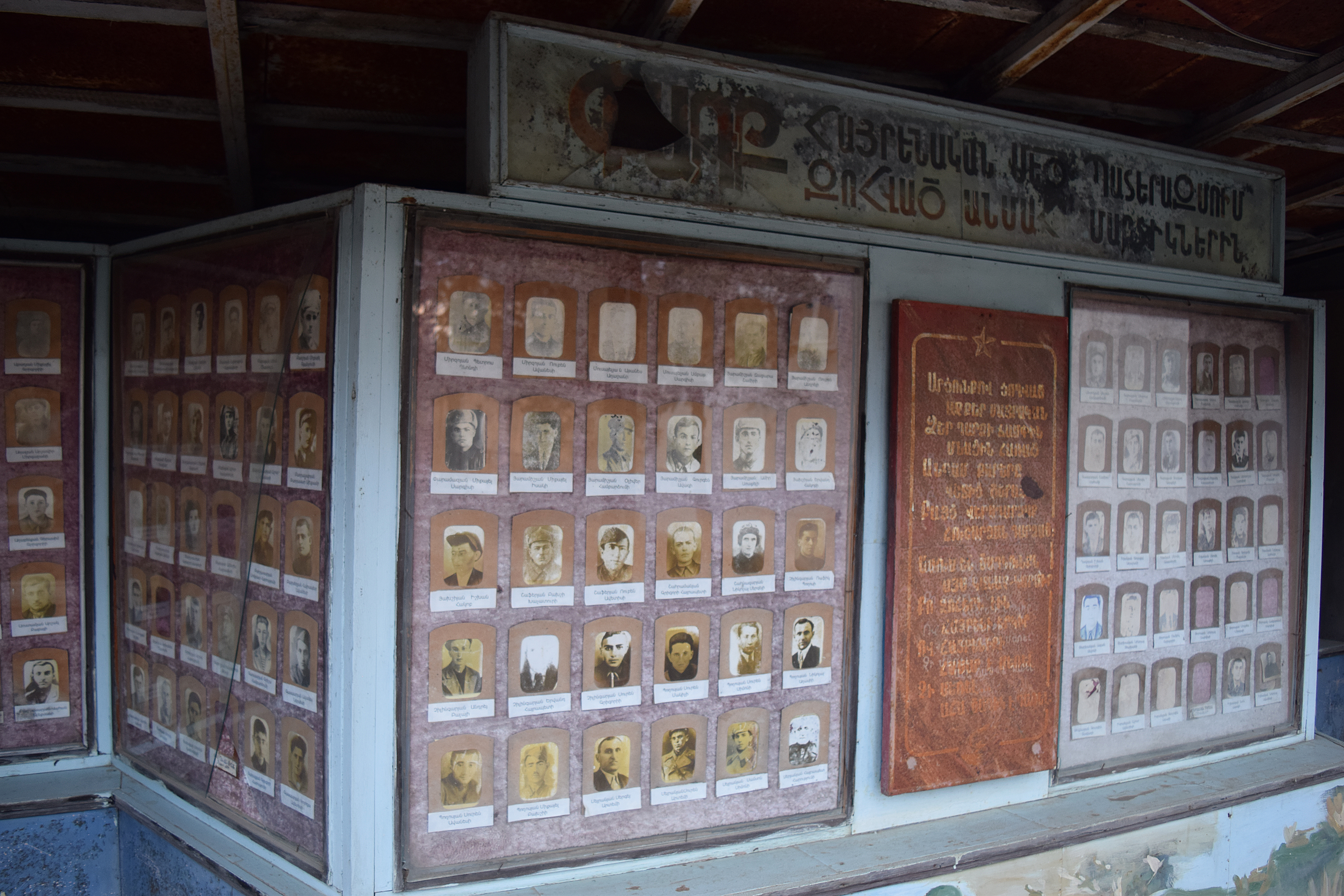
World War II memorial wall

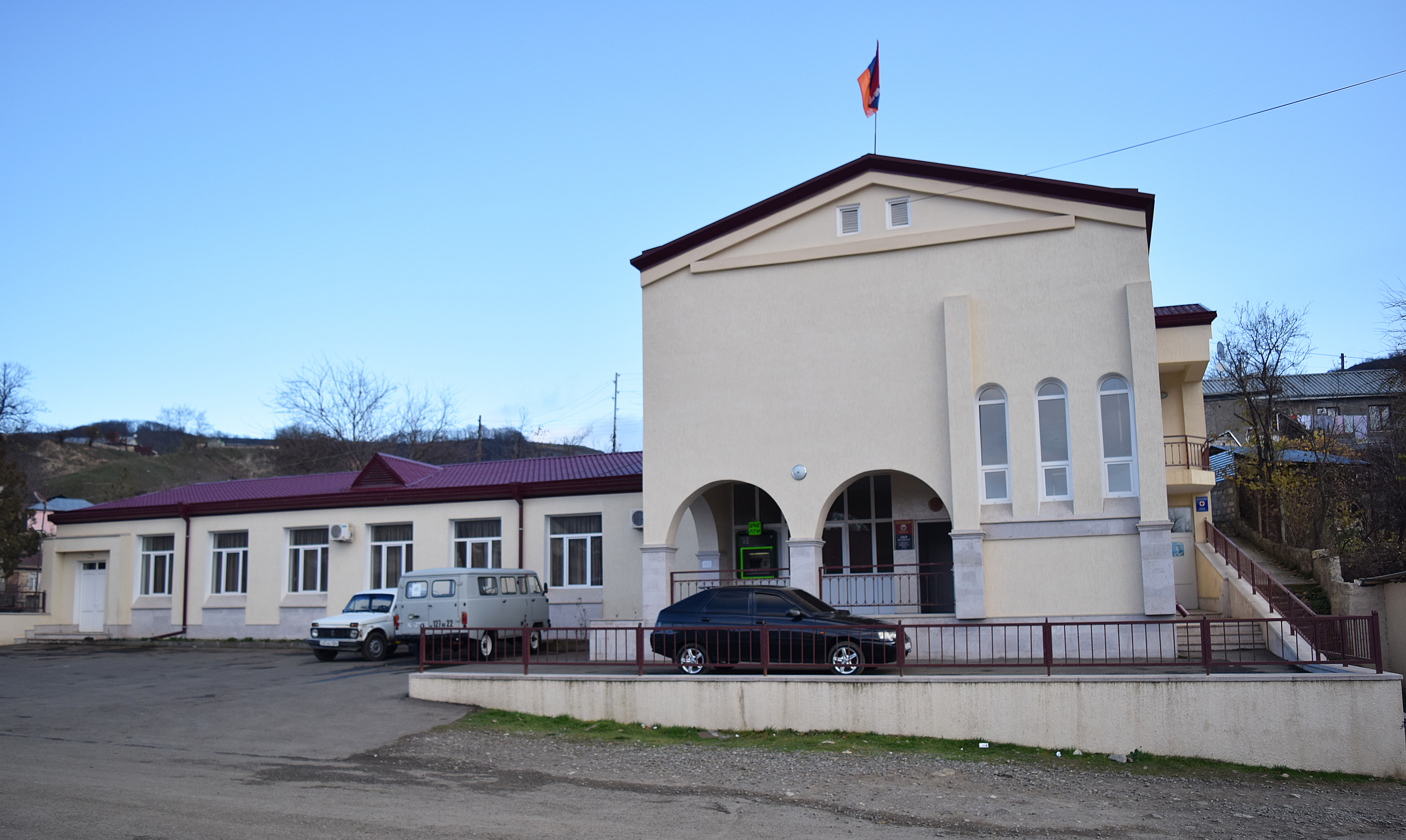
Municipal building

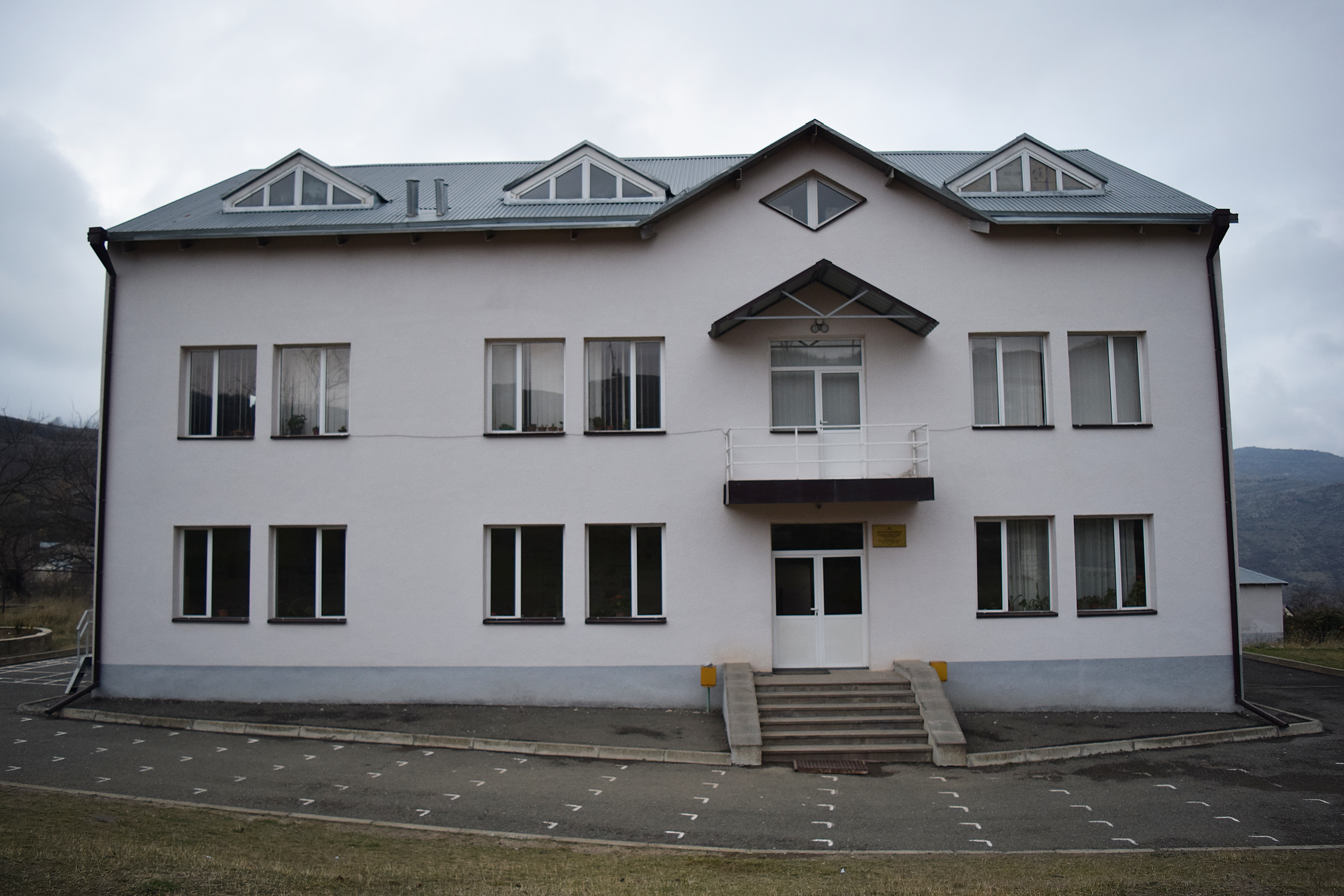
School

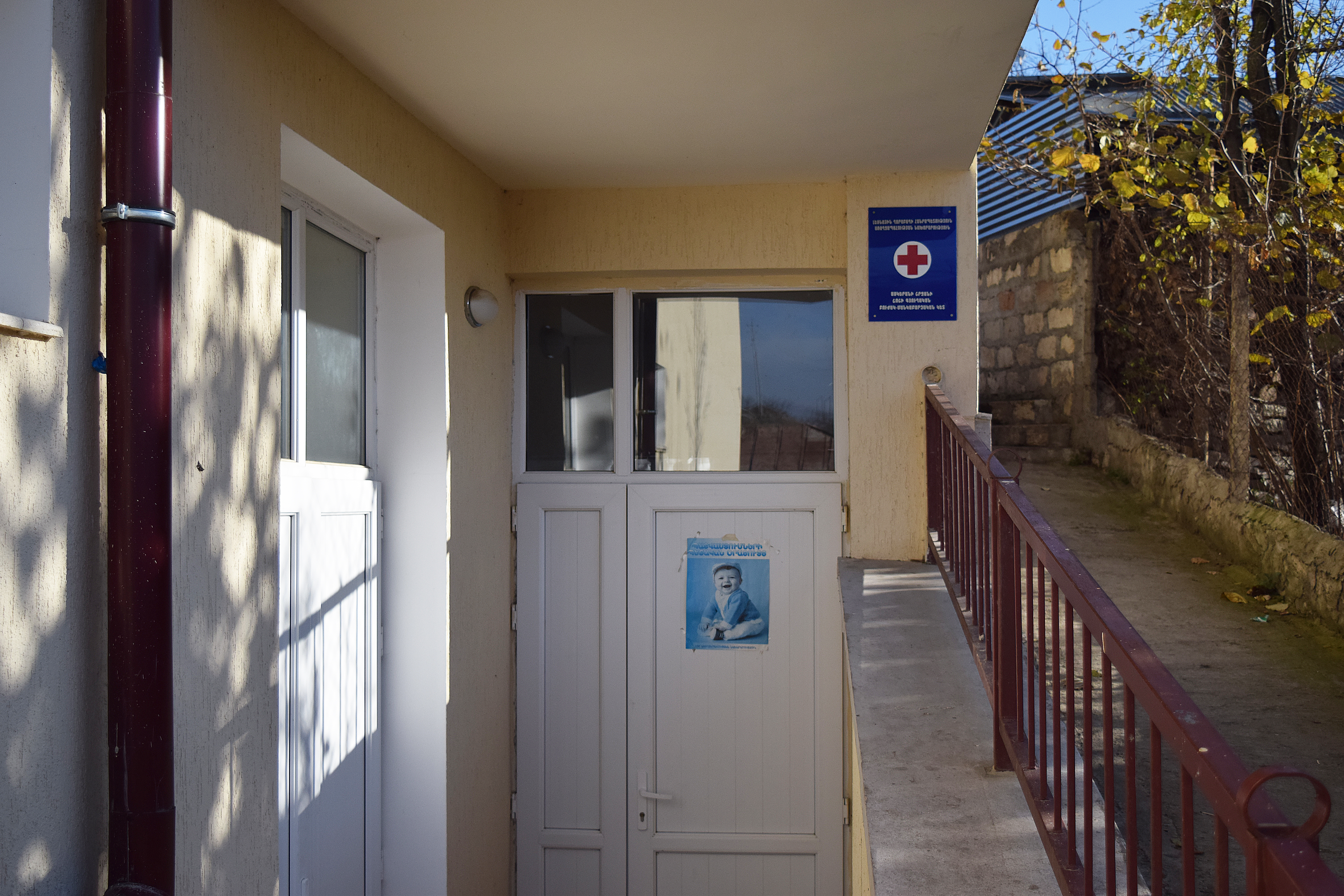
Medical center

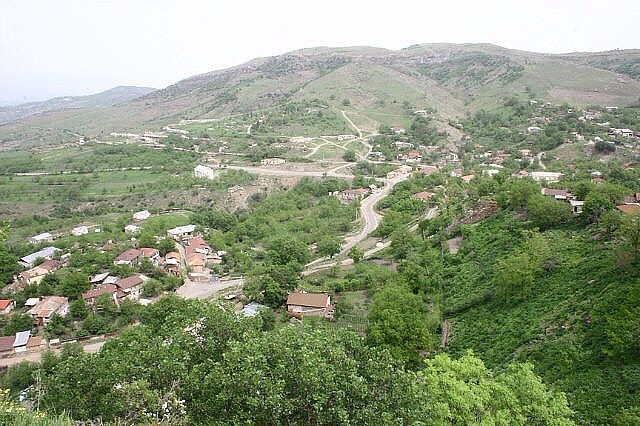
A view of the village
