= Mukhtar (name) =

- Gender: Male

Origin
- Region of origin: Arabic, Turkic

Mukhtar (also spelled Muktar, /ˈmʊktɑːr/ or "Mihtar") meaning "chosen" in Arabic: المختار, is the head of a village or mahalle (neighbourhood) in many Arab countries as well as in Turkey. The name is given because mukhtars are usually selected by some consensual or participatory method, often involving an election. Mukhtar or Mihtar is also a common name. In Arab countries such as Yemen it is more often a surname of Ottoman lineage (laqab), whilst in non-Arab Muslim countries it is common as a first name (ism).

== Given name ==
=== Mukhtar ===
- Al-Mukhtar (622–687), an early Muslim revolutionary
- Mukhtar Ablyazov (born 1963), Kazakh opposition leader, businessman, and political activist
- Mukhtar Ahmed (disambiguation), multiple people
- Mukhtar Ali (born 1997), Saudi footballer
- Mukhtar Ali (footballer, born 1962), Pakistani footballer
- Mukhtar Aliyev (1933–2015), Soviet and Kazakh surgeon
- Mukhtar Altynbayev (born 1945), Kazakh politician
- Mukhtar Anis (1943–2021), Indian politician
- Mukhtar Ansari (1963–2024), Indian gangster and convicted murderer
- Mukhtar Ashraf (1916–1996), Indian Sufi saint
- Mukhtar Ashrafi (1912–1975), Soviet Uzbek composer
- Mukhtar Auezov (1897–1961), Kazakh writer
- Mukhtar Aymakhanov (born 1967), Russian cosmonaut
- Mukhtar Babayev (born 1967), Azerbaijani politician
- Mukhtar Ahmad Bandh, Indian politician
- Mukhtar Begum (1901–1982), Pakistani singer and musician
- Mukhtar Ahmad Bharath (born 1976), Pakistani politician
- Mukhtar Bhatti (1932–??), Pakistani field hockey player
- Mukhtar Zakari Chawai (born 1978), Nigerian politician
- Mukhtar Dadashov (1913–1998), Soviet and Azerbaijani theater and film actor, film director, screenwriter, and cameraman
- Mukhtar Dar, Pakistani-born artist and activist
- Mukhtar Ahmad Dogar (1922–2004), Pakistan Air Force bomber pilot
- Mukhtar Dzhakishev (born 1963), Kazakh businessman
- Mukhtar Fallatah (born 1987), Saudi footballer
- Mukhtar Gusengadzhiyev (born 1964), Russian circus, film, and television actor
- Mukhtar Hussain (born 1999), Indian cricketer
- Mukhtar Shehu Idris (born 1974), Nigerian administrator and politician
- Mukhtar Khan, Indian photographer
- Mukhtar al-Kunti (1729–1811), Malian Sufi leader
- Mukhtar Atiku Kurawa (born 1970), Nigerian academic and administrator
- Mukhtar Shehu Ladan (born 1986), Nigerian politician
- Mukhtar Magauin (1940–2025), Kazakh writer and publicist
- Mukhtar Mai (born 1972), Pakistani human rights activist
- Mukhtar Maniyev (1935–2016), Azerbaijani actor
- Mukhtar Masood (1926–2017), Pakistani Urdu writer and bureaucrat
- Mukhtar Mohammed (born 1990), Somali-born British middle-distance runner
- Mukhtar Kul-Mukhammed (born 1960), Kazakh statesman and politician
- Mukhtar Mukhtarov (born 1986), Kazakh footballer
- Mukhtar Abbas Naqvi (born 1957), Indian politician
- Mukhtar Rana (1928–2014), Pakistani politician, activist, and educator
- Mukhtar Sahota, British Punjabi music composer and producer
- Mukhtar Sanusi (born 2002), Nigerian footballer
- Mukhtar Shakhanov (1942–2026), Kazakh writer and politician
- Mukhtar Siddiqui (1919–1972), Pakistani poet, writer and broadcaster
- Mukhtar Suleiman (born 1998), Somali footballer
- Mukhtar al-Thaqafi (622–687), Arab Pro-Alid revolutionary
- Mukhtar Tileuberdi (born 1968), Kazakh statesman, diplomat, and ambassador
- Mukhtar Umarov (born 1987), Kazakh film director
- Mukhtar Yero (born 1968), Nigerian politician
- Ahmad Mukhtar Baban (1900–1976), Prime Minister of Iraq
- Mahmud Mukhtar Pasha (1867–1935), Ottoman-born Turkish military officer and diplomat
- Sheikh Mukhtar Mohamed Hussein (1912–2012), Somali politician
- Sheikh Mukhtar Robow (born 1969), former deputy leader and former spokesman of Al-Shabaab

=== Muktar ===
- Muktar Hussein Afrah, Somali army officer
- Muktar Ali (born 1989), Bangladeshi cricketer
- Muktar Aliyu Betara (born 1966), Nigerian accountant and lawmaker
- Muktar Edris (born 1994), Ethiopian runner
- Muktar Said Ibrahim (born 1978), Eritrean-British terrorist
- Muktar Kedir, Ethiopian politician
- Muktar Muhammed (1944–2017), Nigerian politician
- Muktar Shagari (born 1956), Nigerian politician
- Muktar Tolani Shagaya (born 1989), Nigerian politician
- Muktar Yahya Najee al-Warafi (born 1974), Yemeni Guantanamo detainee

== Surname ==
- Abdullahi Sarki Mukhtar (born 1949), Nigerian politician
- Abu Hamza al-Mukhtar (died 748), Ibadi Kharijite rebel leader
- Ahmad Mukhtar (1946–2020), Pakistani politician and businessman
- Ahmed Mukhtar (born 1967), Iraqi musician
- Aloma Mariam Mukhtar (born 1944), Nigerian chief justice 2012–2014
- Bilqees Mukhtar (born 1969), Pakistani politician
- Habibullah Mukhtar (1944–1997), Pakistani Islamic scholar and writer
- Hany Mukhtar (born 1995), Sudanese-German professional footballer
- Ibrahim Mukhtar (1909–1969), former Grand Mufti of Eritrea
- Mohamed Haji Mukhtar (born 1947), Somali-American scholar and writer
- Naveed Mukhtar, Pakistan Army lieutenant general
- Omar Mukhtar (1858–1931), Libyan revolutionary and imam
- Sheikh Mukhtar (1914–1980), Indian actor
- Usman Mukhtar (born 1985), Pakistani actor, director, producer and cinematographer

== See also ==
- Mokhtar (name)
- Muhtar
