= Deh-e Mokhtar =

Deh-e Mokhtar ده مختار
- Village
- Location within Iran
- Coordinates: 31°08′09″N 61°48′02″E
- Country: Iran
- Province: Sistan and Baluchestan
- County: Hirmand
- Bakhsh: Central
- Rural District: Dust Mohammad

Population (2006)
  - Total: 403
- Time zone: UTC+3:30 (IRST)
  - Summer (DST): UTC+4:30 (IRDT)

Deh-e Mokhtar (Persian: ده مختار, also Romanized as Deh-e Mokhtār; also known as Deh-e Āqā Mokhtārī and Mokhtār) is a village in Dust Mohammad Rural District, in the Central District of Hirmand County, Sistan and Baluchestan Province, Iran. At the 2006 census, its population was 403, in 69 families.
