= Mokhtar Meherzi =

Algerian politician

Mokhtar Meherzi was the Algerian minister for transport in the 1992 government of Belaid Abdessalam.
