= Moktar (surname) =

Arabic surname

Moktar is a surname of Arabic origin.

People with the surname include:

- Aidi Moktar (born 1955), Malaysian politician and Member of the Sabah State Legislative Assembly who served as the State Minister of Law and Native Affairs from 2018 to 2020
- Naim Moktar (born 1994), Malaysian politician and Member of Parliament who served as the Political Secretary to the Minister of Tourism, Culture and Environment of Sabah from 2020 to 2023
