= Shah Mokhtar =

Shah Mokhtar شاه مختار
- Village
- Location within Iran
- Coordinates: 30°40′43″N 51°31′31″E
- Country: Iran
- Province: Kohgiluyeh and Boyer-Ahmad
- County: Boyer-Ahmad
- Bakhsh: Central
- Rural District: Sarrud-e Jonubi

Population (2006)
  - Total: 93
- Time zone: UTC+3:30 (IRST)
  - Summer (DST): UTC+4:30 (IRDT)

Shah Mokhtar (Persian: شاه مختار, also Romanized as Shāh Mokhtār; also known as Mokhtār and Shāh Mokhtār-e Soflá) is a village in Sarrud-e Jonubi Rural District, in the Central District of Boyer-Ahmad County, Kohgiluyeh and Boyer-Ahmad Province, Iran. At the 2006 census, its population was 93, in 21 families.
