= Mokhtar (name) =

Mokhtar came from the Arabic word which means Chosen. It is used as both a surname and a given name. Notable people with the name include:

Surname:

- Mokhtar Mokhtar (born 1954), Egyptian footballer
- Youness Mokhtar (born 1991), Dutch-Moroccan footballer

Given name:

- Mokhtar Belmokhtar (born 1972), Algerian sentenced to death for murder and terrorism
- Mokhtar Ben Nacef (1927–2006), Tunisian footballer and manager
- Mokhtar Dahari (1953–1991), Malaysian footballer
- Mokhtar Haouari (born 1970), Algerian-Canadian sentenced to 24-years imprisonment for terrorism
- Mokhtar Hashim (1942–2020), Malaysian convicted killer and former politician
- Mokhtar Kechamli (1962–2019), Algerian football manager and former player
- Mokhtar Lamhene (born 1990), Algerian football player
- Mokhtar Meherzi, Algerian politician

== See also ==
- Mukhtar (name)
