= Ahmet Muhtar Merter =

Turkish soldier, industrialist, sports official and politician

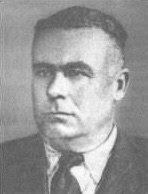

Personal details
- Born: 1 July 1891 Constantinople, Ottoman Empire
- Died: 2 October 1959 (aged 68) Istanbul, Turkey

Ahmet Muhtar Merter, also known as Ahmed Muhtar Bey (1 July 1891, Constantinople – 2 October 1959, Istanbul), was a Turkish soldier, industrialist, sports official and politician.

== Sports ==
Between 1957–1959 Ahmet Muhtar was the president or so called Ağa of the federation that organized the Turkish national sport yağlı güreş (oil wrestling).

== Legacy ==
In Istanbul the suburb Merter is named after him. A picture of him hangs inside the museum of the Anıtkabir. There is also an elementary school in Merter named after him.
