= Mukhtar Umarov =

Kazakh director & actor (born 1987)

- Мұхтар Омаров
- Born: December 2, 1987 (age 38); Alma-Ata, Kazakh SSR, Soviet Union
- Occupations: Film director; actor; screenwriter
- Years active: 2008–present

Mukhtar Kalilauly Umarov (Kazakh: Мұхтар Қалилаұлы Умаров, romanized: Mūhtar Qalilaūly Umarov; sometimes credited as Mukhtar K. Umarov; born 2 December 1987) is a Kazakh film director, actor and screenwriter. He was born in Alma-Ata, Soviet Kazakhstan. In 2015, Umarov was presented the First Republic Award of Film and Television - Jas Didar for the film, Invasion.

== Biography ==
In 1987, Umarov graduated from the graphic design school of Symbat. From 2011 to 2014, he worked in television as web designer and producer. His first notable role was in the film Invasion, which succeeded in winning of Best Visual Effects award.

== Filmography ==
Year	Title	Role	Notes	
2006	Akhmet Zhubanov (documentary)	Photographer	Kazakhfilm	
2006	Islam – The Religion of Ancestors (documentary)	Photographer	Han-Tengri Studio	
2007	Muhammad Haidar Dulati (documentary)	Computer graphics	Kazakhfilm	
2008	Legendary Baurzhan (documentary)	Computer graphics	Kazakhfilm	
2008	Music of My Soul (documentary)	Computer graphics	KalilaFilm.kz	
2008	Zholdasbek Adaev. Encyclopedia of the Strong (documentary)	Film editor, Computer graphics	KalilaFilm.kz	
2009	Patriarch of Kazakh Oil – Safi Utebaev (documentary)	Film editor, Computer graphics	KalilaFilm.kz / "Neftyanik" Foundation	
2010	Alash Orda (documentary)	Film editor, Computer graphics	dir. Kalila Umarov	
2010	Kazakh’s Baurzhan (documentary)	Film editor, Computer graphics	Kazakhfilm	
2010	The Pioneer (documentary)	Film editor, Computer graphics	KalilaFilm.kz / "Neftyanik" Foundation	
2011	Codex Cumanicus – Principles of the Simple Kazakh (documentary)	Director, Computer graphics	KalilaFilm.kz	
2012	That Very Abylkanov (documentary)	Film editor, Computer graphics	KalilaFilm.kz / "Neftyanik" Foundation	
2013	Chokin, Shafik Chokinovich (documentary)	Film editor, Computer graphics	KalilaFilm.kz	
2013	Kenesary (documentary)	Film editor, Computer graphics	KalilaFilm.kz (production started)	
2013–2014	Temirbek Zhurgenev (documentary)	Film editor, Computer graphics	KalilaFilm.kz	
2014	N. Marabayev Foundation – 10 Years (documentary)	Film editor, Computer graphics	KalilaFilm.kz	
2014	Ashirbek Sygai (documentary)	Computer graphics	Kazakhfilm	
2015	Invasion (Басып кіру) (short film)	Director, Writer	Winner of Jas Didar award for Best Visual Effects	
2015	Animal (Мал) (short film)	Director, Writer, Actor		
2016	Story of a Hacker	Director, Writer		
2020	The Secret of Mäkei Tore	Director		
2022	The Great Steppe Dawn (Ұлы Дала Таңы)	Composer	dir. Akan Satayev	
2023	Tokkozha’s Red Apple	Director		
2024	Arasat Feyzuldaev – The Teacher’s Ideal	Director		
2016 - 2026	Khan Kenesary: The Last Battle	Feature Film	Director, Writer	Historical epic
2026	GISKHAGI – 90 Years	Documentary	Director, Writer	Produced for the 90th anniversary of GISKHAGI

== Awards ==
- Jas Didar – Best Visual Effects for Invasion (2015)
