= Mkhitarashen =

Mkhitarashen / Mukhtar Մխիթարաշեն / Muxtar
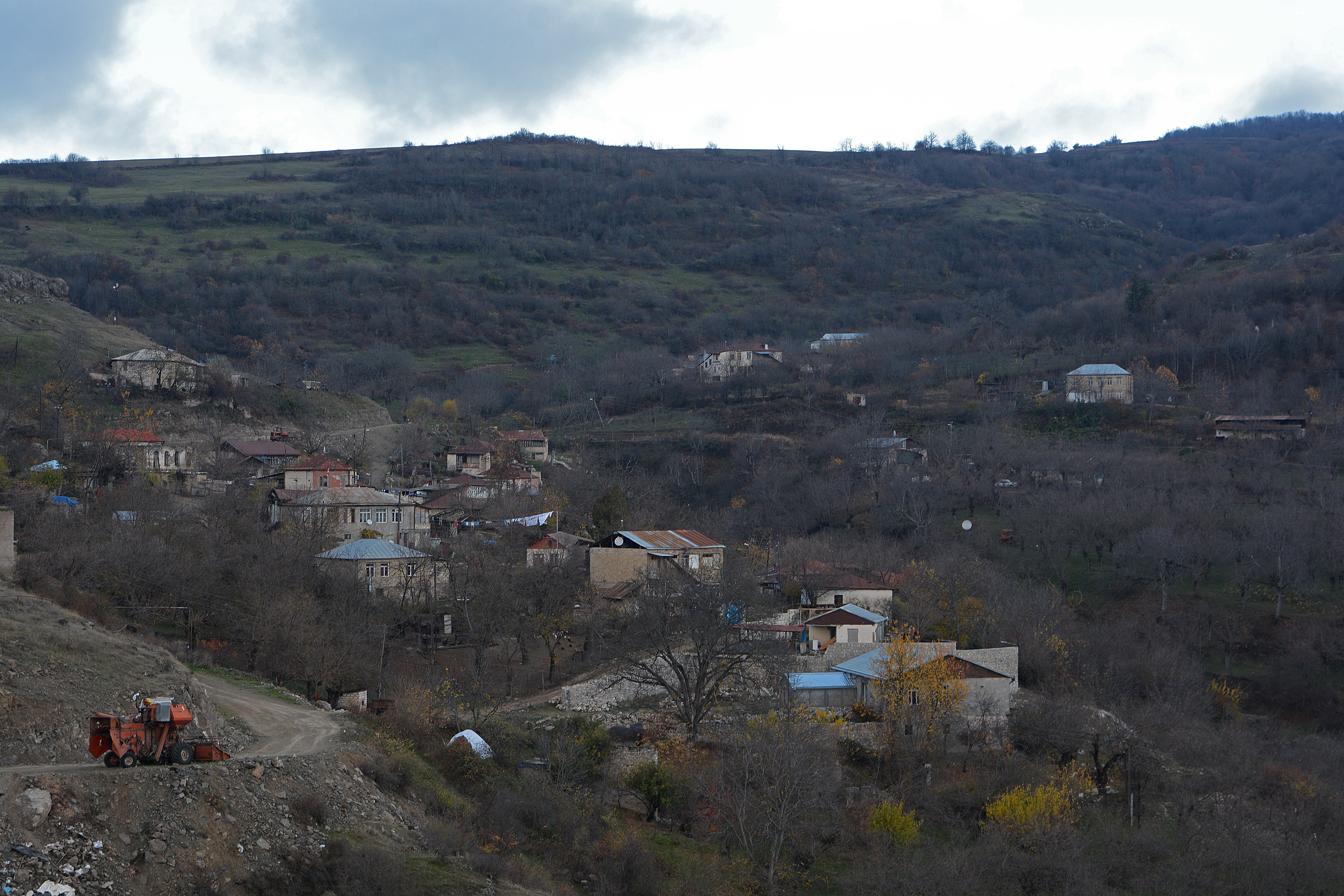

- Location within Azerbaijan
- Coordinates: 39°45′41″N 46°46′28″E
- Country: Azerbaijan
  - District: Khojaly

Population (2015)
  - Total: 91
- Time zone: UTC+4 (AZT)

Mkhitarashen (Armenian: Մխիթարաշեն) or Mukhtar (Azerbaijani: Muxtar) is a village located in the Khojaly District of Azerbaijan, in the disputed region of Nagorno-Karabakh. Until 2023 it was controlled by the breakaway Republic of Artsakh. The village had an ethnic Armenian-majority population until the expulsion of the Armenian population of Nagorno-Karabakh by Azerbaijan following the 2023 Azerbaijani offensive in Nagorno-Karabakh.

== Toponymy ==
The village was known as Mkhitarikend (Armenian: Մխիթարիքենդ; Azerbaijani: Mxitarikənd; Russian: Мхитарикенд) during the Soviet period.

== History ==
During the Soviet period, the village was part of the Askeran District of the Nagorno-Karabakh Autonomous Oblast. The village has been administrated as part of the Askeran Province of the Republic of Artsakh after the First Nagorno-Karabakh War.

There was some initial confusion regarding control of the village after the 2020 Nagorno-Karabakh war, however, on 1 March 2021, the Armenian news organization CivilNet published a video report from the village, confirming continued Artsakh control.

== Historical heritage sites ==
Historical heritage sites in and around the village include a 17th/18th-century cemetery and the 19th-century church of Surb Astvatsatsin (Armenian: Սուրբ Աստվածածին, lit. 'Holy Mother of God'). A monument in honor of the 18th-century Armenian satirist and fabulist Pele Pughi was built in 1976 between Mkihtarashen and Shosh.

== Economy and culture ==
The population is mainly engaged in agriculture and animal husbandry. As of 2015, the village has a municipal building, a house of culture, and a medical centre. Students study in the secondary school of the neighboring village of Shosh.

== Demographics ==
The village has an ethnic Armenian-majority population, had 90 inhabitants in 2005, and 91 inhabitants in 2015.

== Gallery ==
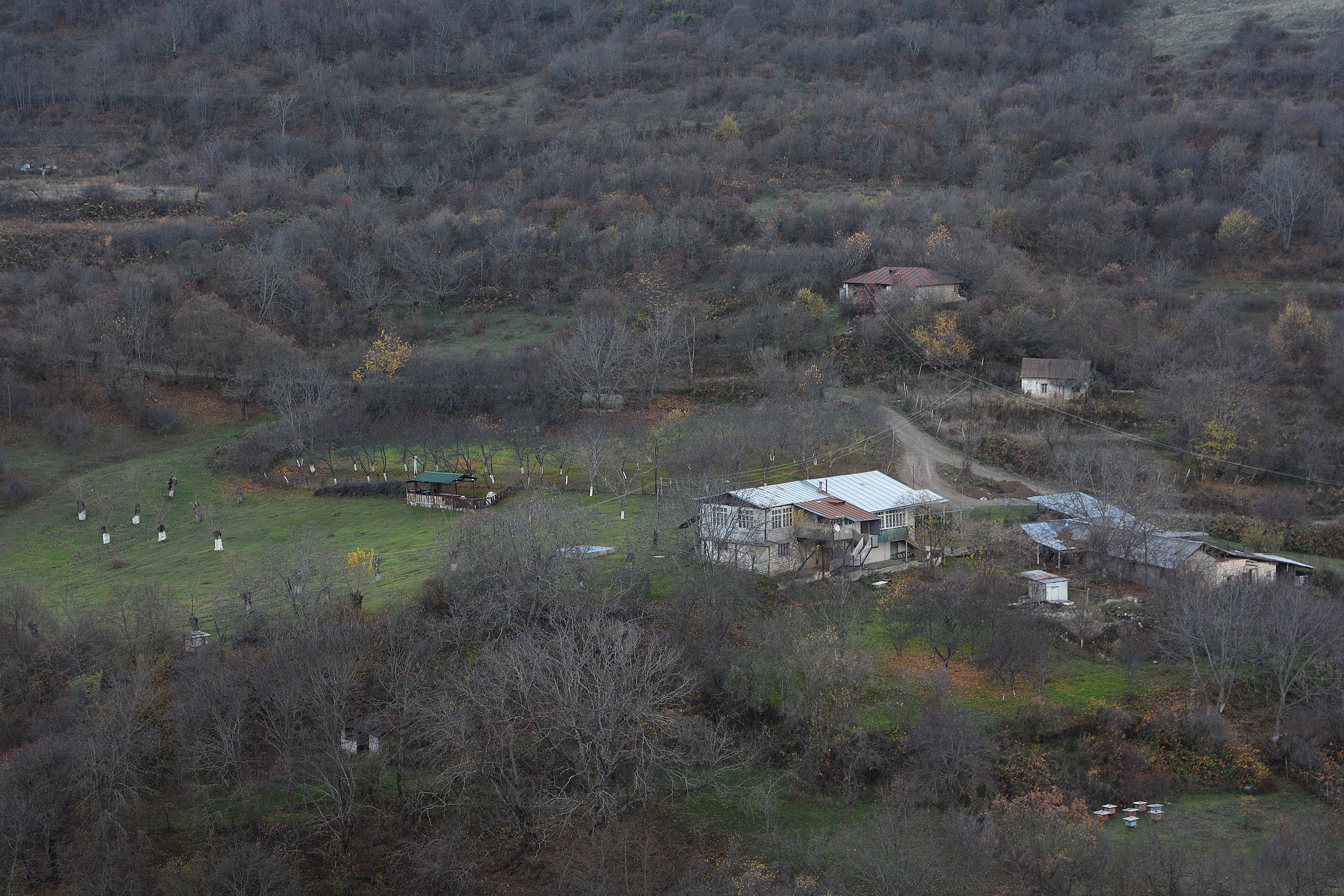
A view of the village

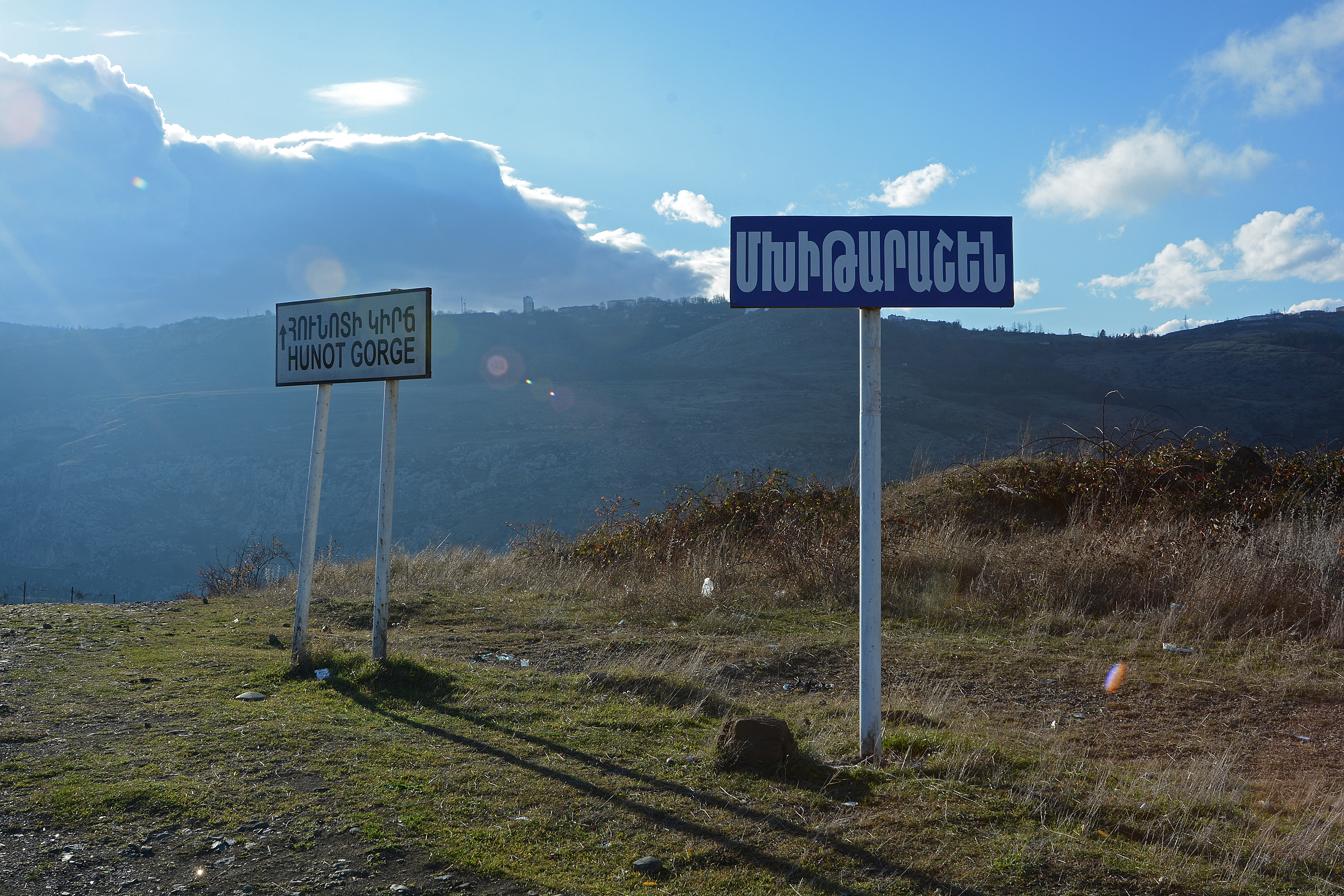
A sign reading "Mkhitarashen" in Armenian

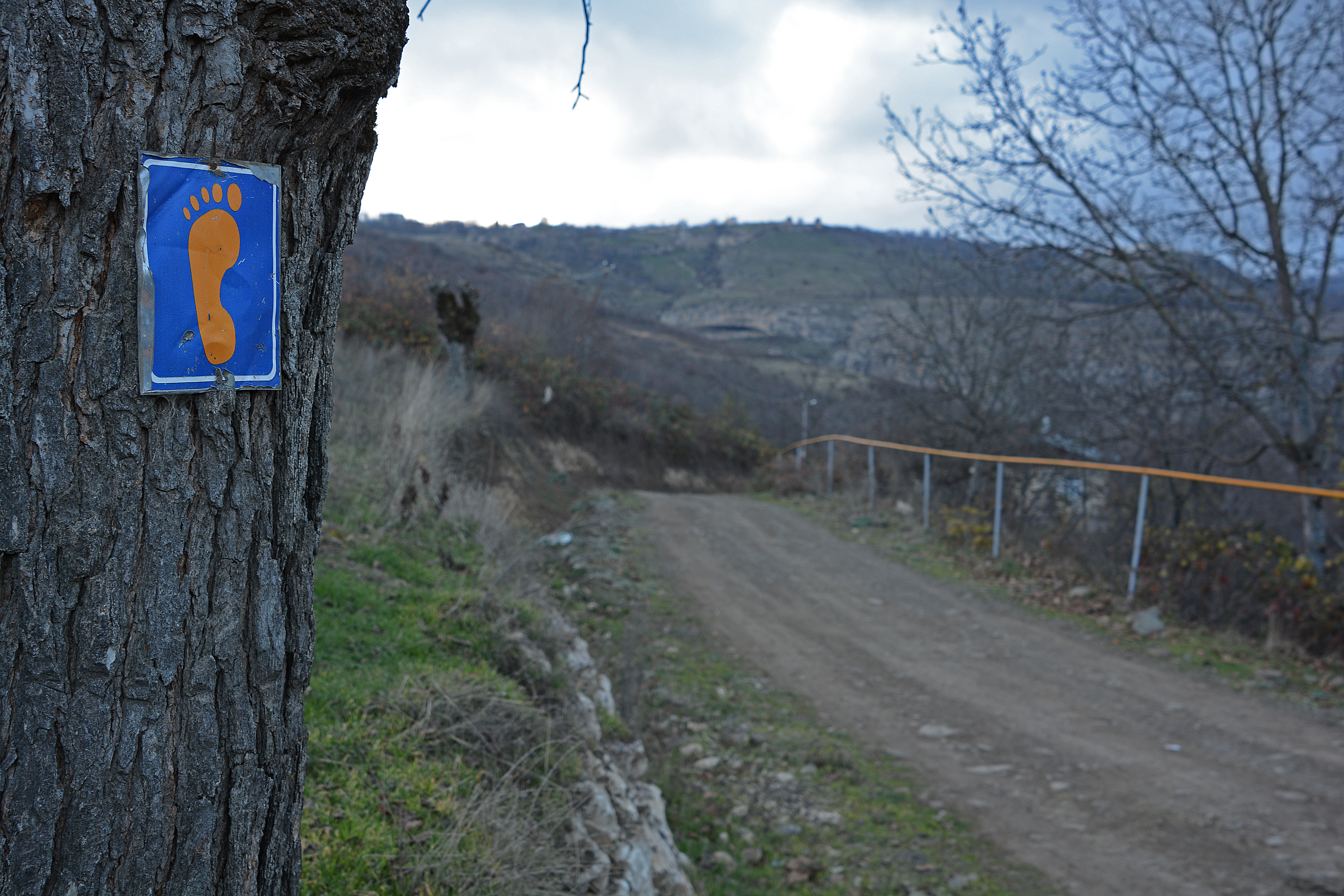
Janapar Trail sign in the village

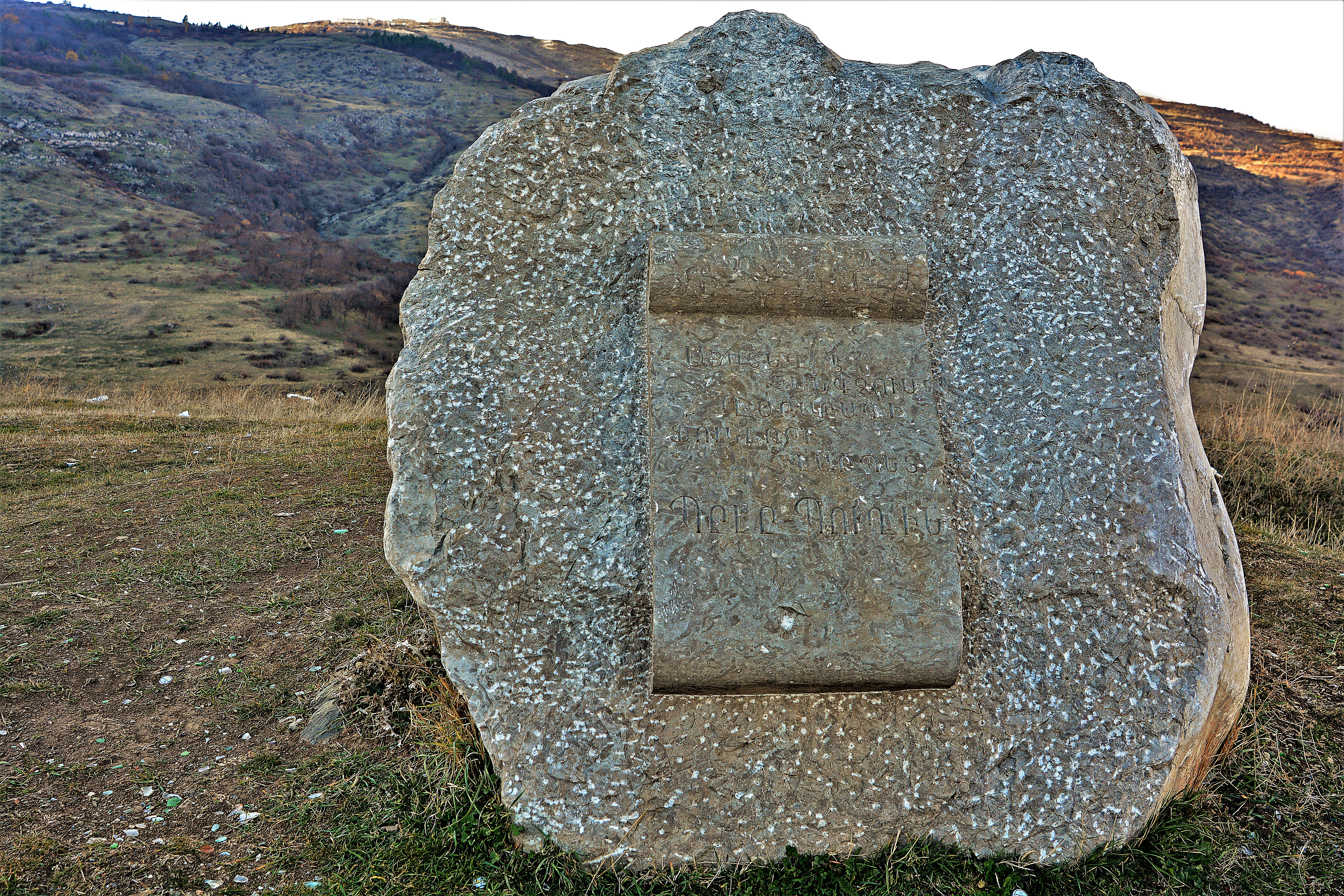
Monument to Pele Pughi

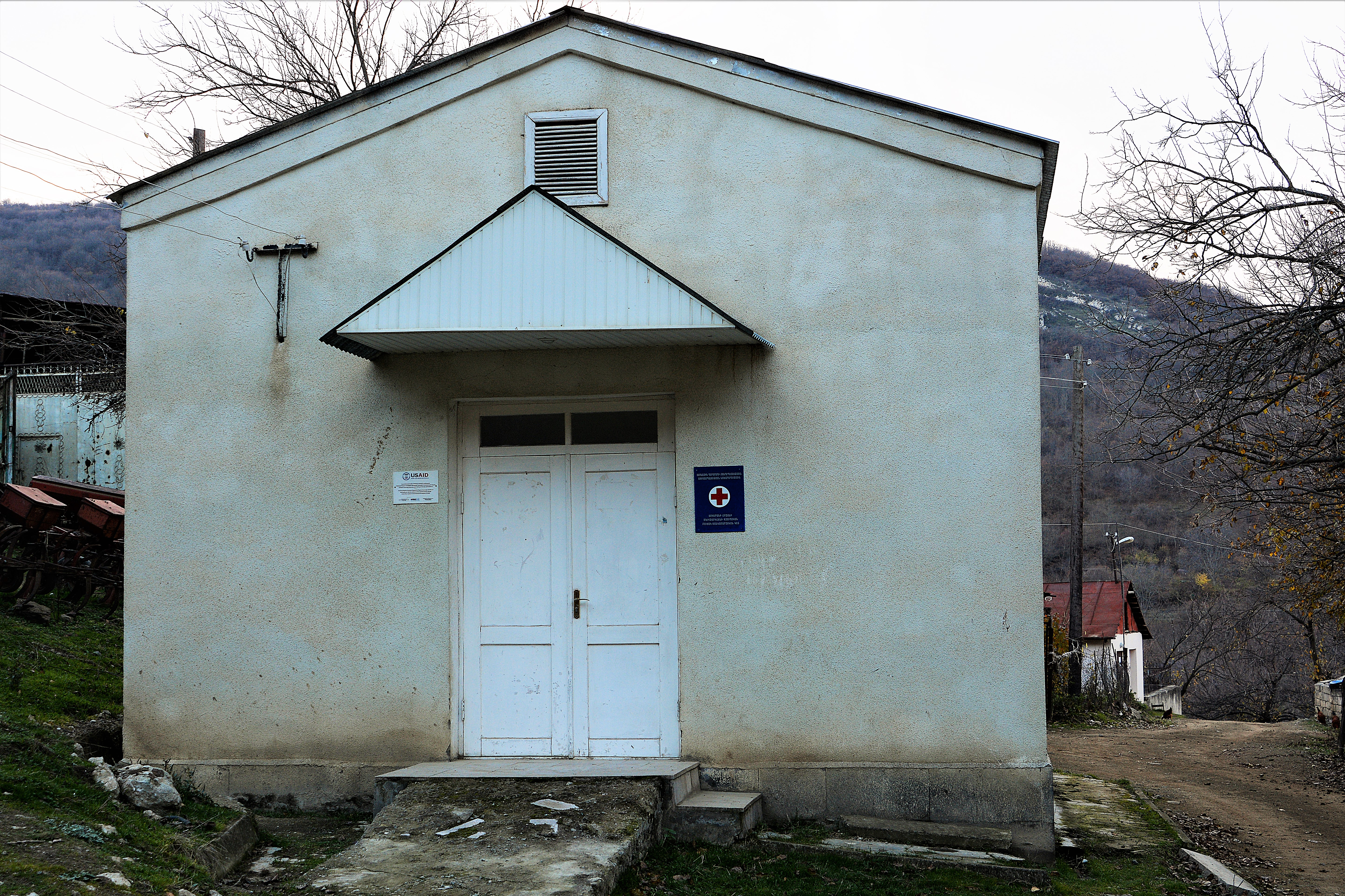
Aid station

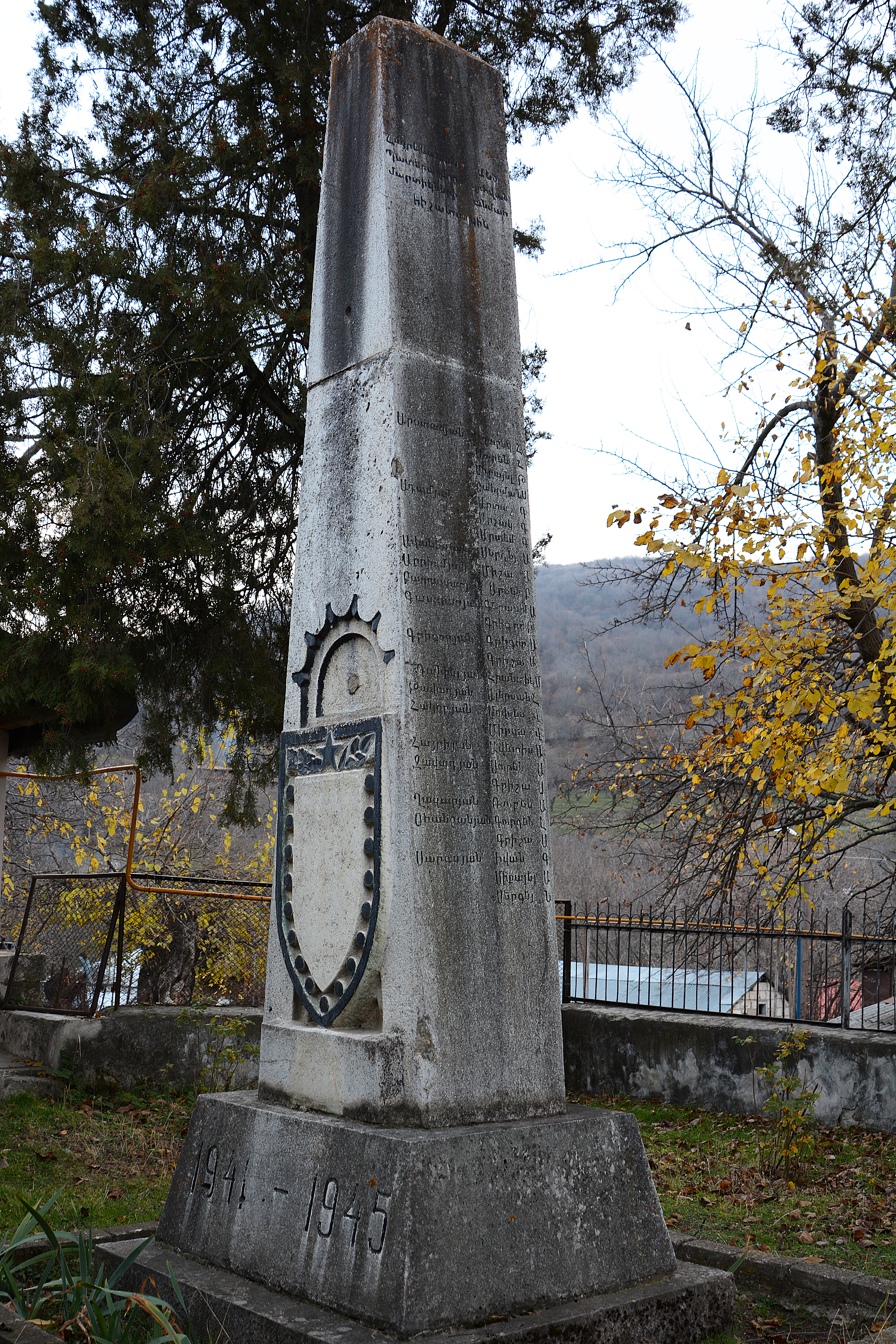
WWII memorial
