= Deaths in February 1992 =

The following is a list of notable deaths in February 1992.

Entries for each day are listed alphabetically by surname. A typical entry lists information in the following sequence:

- Name, age, country of citizenship at birth, subsequent country of citizenship (if applicable), reason for notability, cause of death (if known), and reference.

== February 1992 ==
=== 1 ===
- Mohan Choti, 57, Indian actor.
- Maurice John Dingman, 78, American bishop of the Catholic Church.
- Jean Hamburger, 82, French physician, surgeon and essayist.
- Irving Kaufman, 81, American judge, pancreatic cancer.
- Hussein Kamel Montasser, 68, Egyptian basketball player.
- Frank Spitzer, 65, Austrian-American mathematician.

=== 2 ===
- William H. Becker, 82, American district judge (United States District Court for the Western District of Missouri).
- Philip Erenberg, 82, American gymnast and Olympic silver medalist (1932).
- Theodor Gaster, 85, British-American biblical scholar.
- Paul Huston, 66, American basketball player.
- Bert Parks, 77, American television personality and Miss America and host, lung cancer.
- Vladimír Čech, 77, Czechoslovak film director and screenwriter.
- Bredo Wass, 88, Norwegian footballer.

=== 3 ===
- Ole Aarnæs, 103, Norwegian Olympic high jumper (1912).
- Otto Arndt, 71, East German politician.
- Junior Cook, 57, American hard bop tenor saxophone player.
- Knut Fridell, 83, Swedish freestyle wrestler and Olympic champion (1936).
- Mário Peixoto, 83, Brazilian film director.
- Jan van Aartsen, 82, Dutch politician and jurist.

=== 4 ===
- Luigi Cavalieri, 77, Italian Olympic bobsledder (1948, 1952).
- Alan Davies, 30, British footballer, suicide by carbon monoxide poisoning.
- John Dehner, 76, American actor (The Right Stuff, The Doris Day Show, The Boys from Brazil), emphysema.
- Lisa Fonssagrives, 80, Swedish-American fashion model.
- Vittorio Gelmetti, 65, Italian composer.
- Jay Ilagan, 37, Filipino actor, motorcycle accident.
- Gurmit Singh Kullar, 84-85, Indian Olympic field hockey player (1932).
- Ned Locke, 72, American television personality and radio announcer, liver cancer.
- Gianni Rizzo, 67, Italian film actor.
- Joseph Shimmon, 97, American Olympic wrestler (1920).
- Werner Wittig, 82, German Olympic cyclist (1932).

=== 5 ===
- Sergio Méndez Arceo, 84, Mexican Roman Catholic bishop and human rights activist.
- Nicomedes Santa Cruz, 66, Peruvian singer, songwriter and musicologist.
- Paul A. Freund, 83, American jurist and law professor, cancer.
- Joseph MacManus, 21, Irish republican volunteer, shot.
- Carter Manasco, 90, American politician, member of the United States House of Representatives (1941-1949).
- Harry Mattos, 80, American gridiron football player (Green Bay Packers, Cleveland Rams).
- Walt Singer, 80, American football player (New York Giants).
- Ernest Thornton, 86, British politician.
- Bill Wheatley, 82, American Olympic basketball player (1936).

=== 6 ===
- John Greenstock, 86, English cricket player.
- Wayde Preston, 62, American actor (Colt .45, Sugarfoot, Captain America), colorectal cancer.
- Felix Rexhausen, 59, German journalist, editor and author.
- Cedric Sloane, 76, Australian Olympic cross-country skier (1952).

=== 7 ===
- Bob Allen, 75, English football player.
- Erik Jensen, 59, Danish footballer.
- André Lancelot, 91, French Olympic rower (1924).
- Radharaman Mitra, 94, Indian revolutionary Bengali writer.
- Shinsuke Ogawa, 56, Japanese documentary film director, liver failure.
- Sulom-Bek Oskanov, 48, Soviet and Russian air force officer, plane crash.
- Gunnar Randers, 77, Norwegian physicist.
- Buzz Sawyer, 32, American professional wrestler, drug overdose.
- Noel Webster, 60, Australian rules footballer.

=== 8 ===
- Fabian Gaffke, 78, American baseball player (Boston Red Sox, Cleveland Indians).
- Baruch Lumet, 93, Polish-American actor.
- Roland Robinson, 79, Australian poet and writer.
- Wally Shannon, 59, American baseball player (St. Louis Cardinals).
- Bazoline Estelle Usher, 106, American educator.
- Tom Williams, 51, American ice hockey player and Olympian (1960), heart attack.
- Denny Wright, 67, English jazz guitarist, bladder cancer.

=== 9 ===
- Leon Clore, 73, English film producer.
- Willie Fagan, 74, Scottish football player.
- Andor Földes, 78, Hungarian pianist, fall.
- Jack Gervasoni, 62, Australian rules footballer.
- Jack Kinney, 82, American animator and film director (Pinocchio, Dumbo, The Adventures of Ichabod and Mr. Toad).
- Boonsong Lekagul, 84, Thai medical doctor, biologist, and conservationist.
- Andrés Neubauer, 83, Chilean Olympic fencer (1948).

=== 10 ===
- Vladimir Brovikov, 60, Soviet and Russian politician.
- Byron Gentry, 78, American football player (Pittsburgh Pirates).
- William Percival Gray, 79, American district judge.
- Alex Haley, 70, American author (Roots: The Saga of an American Family), heart attack.
- Lynn Carlton Higby, 53, American district judge (United States District Court for the Northern District of Florida).
- Fred Hynes, 83, American sound engineer (West Side Story, The Sound of Music, Oklahoma!), five-time Oscar winner.
- Yoshiko Okada, 89, Japanese stage and film actress.
- Jim Pepper, 50, American musician, lymphoma.
- Doyt Perry, 82, American football player and coach.
- Meade Roberts, 61, American screenwriter, heart attack.
- Bruce Rutherford Thompson, 80, American district judge (United States District Court for the District of Nevada).
- Tom Waye, 82, Australian rules footballer.

=== 11 ===
- Patrick Crehan, 71, Irish Olympic basketball player (1948).
- Ray Danton, 60, American actor (The Rise and Fall of Legs Diamond, The George Raft Story, The Longest Day), kidney failure.
- Johnny Garrett, 28, American convicted murderer, execution by lethal injection.
- Adolph Giesl-Gieslingen, 88, Austrian train designer and engineer.
- Robert W. Russell, 80, American playwright and writer for movies and documentaries.
- Carlos Rein Segura, 94, Spanish politician.

=== 12 ===
- Sandy Douglass, 87, American sailboat racer and designer.
- Yehuda D. Nevo, 60, Middle Eastern archeologist living in Israel.
- Stella Roman, 87, Romanian operatic soprano.
- Bep van Klaveren, 84, Dutch boxer and Olympic featherweight champion (1928).

=== 13 ===
- Nikolai Bogolyubov, 82, Russian theoretical physicist.
- Don Ettinger, 69, American gridiron football player (New York Giants).
- Byron Humphrey, 80, American baseball player (Boston Red Sox).
- Gyula Kovács, 62, Hungarian drummer
- Antun Motika, 89, Croatian artist.
- Earl Rapp, 70, American baseball player and scout.
- Dorothy Tree, 85, American actress, heart failure.
- Bob den Uyl, 61, Dutch writer.
- Ken Walters, 69, American basketball player.
- Warren Westlund, 65, American Olympic rower (1948).

=== 14 ===
- Luigi Ghirri, 49, Italian artist and photographer, heart attack.
- Holger Jernsten, 81, Swedish football player and Olympian (1936).
- Roepie Kruize, 67, Dutch field hockey player and Olympian (1948, 1952).
- Alex Lovy, 78, American animator (The Flintstones, The Jetsons, Heathcliff).
- Hussain Montassir, 68, Egyptian Olympic basketball player (1948, 1952).
- Angelique Pettyjohn, 48, American actress, cervical cancer.
- Helen Vela, 45, Filipina actress and radio and TV personality, colorectal cancer.
- Gene Venzke, 83, American middle-distance runner and Olympian (1936).

=== 15 ===
- Hermann Axen, 75, German political activist.
- Monty Hakansson, 72, Swedish-Australian Olympic wrestler (1956).
- María Elena Moyano, 33, Peruvian activist, murdered.
- Shosaku Numa, 63, Japanese neuroscientist.
- Gerhard Riege, 61, German politician, suicide by hanging.
- William Schuman, 81, American composer, complications from hip surgery.
- Edna Gardner Whyte, 89, American aviator.

=== 16 ===
- Abbas al-Musawi, 39, Lebanese militant and co-founder of Hezbollah, missile strike.
- Angela Carter, 51, English novelist, lung cancer.
- Walter Franz, 80, German theoretical physicist.
- Alberto Gomes, 76, Portuguese football player.
- George MacBeth, 60, Scottish poet.
- Oleksander Ohloblyn, 92, Ukrainian historian.
- Jânio Quadros, 75, Brazilian politician, president (1961).
- Charles Carnegie, 11th Earl of Southesk, 98, British noble.
- Opal Irene Whiteley, 94, American nature writer and diarist.
- Herman Wold, 83, Norwegian-Swedish mathematician.

=== 17 ===
- John Fieldhouse, Baron Fieldhouse, 63, British Royal Navy officer, surgical complications.
- Alfred Hooke, 86, Canadian politician and writer.
- Delio Morollón, 54, Spanish football player.
- Forrest L. Vosler, 68, American Air Force radio operator, Medal of Honor recipient.

=== 18 ===
- Sylvain Arend, 89, Belgian astronomer.
- Thomas A. Ballantine Jr., 65, American district judge (United States District Court for the Western District of Kentucky).
- Roman Filippov, 56, Soviet actor, thromboembolism.
- Robert Gittings, 81, English writer, biographer, playwright and poet.
- Edith Hamlin, 90, American painter and muralist.
- Wang Huayun, 84, Chinese politician.
- James H. Polk, 80, American Army four-star general.
- Karl Schuelke, 77, American football player (Pittsburgh Pirates).

=== 19 ===
- Narayan Shridhar Bendre, 81, Indian artist.
- Mike Bucchianeri, 75, American gridiron football player (Green Bay Packers).
- Joseph Lyman Fisher, 78, American politician, member of the U.S. House of Representatives (1975–1981), bone cancer.
- Takehiko Kanagoki, 77, Japanese Olympic basketball player (1936).
- Felix Makasiar, 76, Filipino lawyer and Chief Justice.
- Buddy O'Grady, 72, American basketball player and coach.
- Vladimir Solomonovich Pozner, 87, Russian-French writer and translator.
- Tojo Yamamoto, 65, American professional wrestler, suicide.

=== 20 ===
- Muhammad Asad, 91, Austrian journalist, writer, political theorist, and diplomat.
- Eugene R. Black, Sr., 93, American banker.
- Steve Buzinski, 74, Canadian ice hockey player (New York Rangers).
- A. J. Casson, 93, Canadian artist.
- Roberto D'Aubuisson, 48, Salvadoran militant, esophageal cancer.
- Pierre Dervaux, 75, French operatic conductor, composer, and pedagogue.
- Joan Dixon, 61, American actress.
- John Kneubuhl, 71, American Samoan screenwriter, playwright and polynesian historian.
- Barbara Lüdemann, 69, German politician.
- Dick York, 63, American actor (Bewitched, Inherit the Wind, Going My Way), emphysema.

=== 21 ===
- William Arrowsmith, 67, American classicist, academic, and translator.
- Charles L. Carpenter, 89, American naval admiral and genealogist.
- Keith Hackshall, 64, Australian Olympic fencer (1956, 1960).
- Kate ter Horst, 85, Dutch housewife known as the Angel of Arnhem during the Battle of Arnhem, traffic collision.
- Eva Jessye, 97, American conductor.
- Jane Pickens Langley, 84, American singer, heart failure.
- Henri Préaux, 80, French rowing coxswain and Olympic silver medalist (1928).
- Haruo Tanaka, 79, Japanese actor.
- María Uribe, 83, Mexican Olympic javelin thrower (1932).

=== 22 ===
- Sudirman Arshad, 37, Malaysian singer-songwriter, pneumonia.
- Nicolas Bochatay, 27, Swiss Olympic speed skier (1992), skiing collision.
- Oscar Broneer, 97, Swedish-American archaeologist.
- Gilbert Chase, 85, American music historian, critic and author, pneumonia.
- Jun Miki, 72, Japanese photographer and photojournalism pioneer.
- Aarno Ruusuvuori, 67, Finnish architect.
- Markos Vafiadis, 86, Greek politician and resistance fighter.
- David Wilson, 84, English football player.
- Paul Winter, 86, French discus thrower and Olympic medalist (1932, 1936).
- Kurt Wires, 72, Finnish Olympic canoer (1948, 1952).
- Tadeusz Łomnicki, 64, Polish actor.

=== 23 ===
- Joseph Armone, 74, American mobster (Gambino crime family).
- Dwight Bolinger, 84, American linguist and academic.
- Valentino Bompiani, 93, Italian publisher, writer and playwright, heart failure.
- Avraham Harman, 77, Israeli diplomat and academic administrator.
- Maurice Raes, 85, Belgian racing cyclist.
- Einar Schanke, 64, Norwegian composer, pianist, and theatrical producer.

=== 24 ===
- Ljubo Benčić, 87, Yugoslav football player and Olympian (1928).
- Jan Dombrowski, 65, Polish Olympic bobsledder (1956).
- Clarrie Jordan, 69, English football player.
- August Lešnik, 77, Croatian football player.
- Doreen Montgomery, 78, British screenwriter.
- Zbigniew Skowroński, 66, Polish Olympic bobsledder (1956).

=== 25 ===
- Zlatko Celent, 39, Yugoslav Olympic rower (1976, 1980, 1984, 1988), traffic accident.
- Guy Deghy, 79, Hungarian-British actor.
- Andrews Engelmann, 90, Russian-German actor.
- Harry D. Felt, 89, American naval aviator.
- F. Russell Miller, 78, New Zealand politician.
- Carl Monssen, 70, Norwegian Olympic rower (1948).
- Ollie O'Toole, 79, American actor.
- Viktor Reznikov, 39, Soviet singer-songwriter, traffic collision.
- Bernard Michael Shanley, 88, American lawyer and politician.

=== 26 ===
- Larry Banks, 60, American R&B and soul singer, songwriter, and record producer.
- Marguerite Ross Barnett, 49, American academic, cancer.
- Gerrit Schulte, 76, Dutch racing cyclist and Olympian (1936).
- Stuart Nash Scott, 85, American lawyer and diplomat, stroke.
- Honey Sri-Isan, 20, Thai singer, traffic collision.
- Jean R. Yawkey, 83, American sports executive (Boston Red Sox) and philanthropist.
- Military personnel killed during the Khojaly massacre:
  - Alif Hajiyev, 38, Azerbaijani officer and war hero.
  - Tofig Huseynov, 37, Azerbaijani commander and war hero.
  - Hikmet Nazarli, 25, Azerbaijani soldier and war hero.
  - Janpolad Rzayev, 24, Azerbaijani soldier and war hero.
  - Araz Selimov, 31, Azerbaijani soldier and war hero.

=== 27 ===
- Iosif Berdiev, 67, Soviet Olympic gymnast (1952).
- Chuck Drazenovich, 64, American gridiron football player (Washington Redskins).
- Algirdas Julien Greimas, 74, Lithuanian-French literary scientist.
- S. I. Hayakawa, 85, Canadian-American academic and politician, member of the U.S. Senate (1977–1983), Alzheimer's disease.
- Katharine Luomala, 84, American anthropologist.
- Miroslav Metzner-Fritz, 88, Yugoslavian Olympic wrestler (1928).
- John Rothenstein, 90, British art historian.
- Antoine Wehenkel, 82, Luxembourgish politician and engineer.

=== 28 ===
- Antonio Bravo, 86, Spanish-Mexican film and television actor.
- Bolesław Orliński, 92, Polish aviator, military, sports and test pilot.
- Enzo Pulcrano, 48, Italian actor and writer.
- Jackie Wiid, 62, South African swimmer and Olympian (1948).
- Bert Wilson, 42, Canadian ice hockey player, stomach cancer.

=== 29 ===
- Yavar Aliyev, 35, Azerbaijani soldier, killed in battle.
- Ada Colangeli, 78, Italian actress.
- Don Heinrich, 61, American football player (New York Giants, Dallas Cowboys, Oakland Raiders), coach, and announcer, cancer.
- Shamshi Kaldayakov, 61, Kazakh composer ("Menıñ Qazaqstanym").
- Ferenc Karinthy, 70, Hungarian novelist, playwright, and journalist.
- La Lupe, 52, Cuban-American singer, heart attack.
- Teófilo Villavicencio Marxuach, 79, Puerto Rican radio broadcaster.
- Ruth Pitter, 94, British poet.
- George Roudebush, 98, American football player and lawyer.
- Sergei Senyuskin, 34, Azerbaijani soldier, killed in battle.
- Eddie Wares, 76, Canadian ice hockey player (New York Rangers, Detroit Red Wings, Chicago Black Hawks).
- Mevhibe İnönü, 97, First Lady of Turkey as wife of president İsmet İnönü.
