= Movsum Mammadov =

National Hero of Azerbaijan

- Born: June 6, 1967 (age 59); Kosalar, Khojaly, Azerbaijan
- Military career
- Allegiance: Republic of Azerbaijan
- Rank: Major
- Conflicts: First Nagorno-Karabakh War
- Awards: National Hero of Azerbaijan; 1992

Movsum Mammadov (Azerbaijani: Mövsüm Şahin oğlu Məmmədov) (June 6, 1967, Khojaly district, Azerbaijan) is the National Hero of Azerbaijan, and the warrior of the First Nagorno-Karabakh War.

== Biography ==
Movsum Mammadov was born on June 6, 1967, in Kosalar village of Khojali district. He finished his education here in 1984. In 1985–1987, he served in the military service. In 1988, he started to work in Shusha district. After 1990, Mammadov began to work in the internal affairs body of Azerbaijan.

== Military activities ==
During the massacre in Khojaly he saved many people's lives. In 1994, he was appointed the Commander of the Police Department of the Shusha district. He graduated from the Police Academy of the Ministry of Internal Affairs of Azerbaijan in 1998.

== National Hero of Azerbaijan ==
Movsum Mammadov was awarded the title of "National Hero of Azerbaijan" by Decree No.533 of the President of the Republic of Azerbaijan dated February 25, 1997.

== See also ==
- First Nagorno-Karabakh War

== Sources ==
- Vüqar Əsgərov. "Azərbaycanın Milli Qəhrəmanları" (Yenidən işlənmiş II nəşr). Bakı: "Dərələyəz-M", 2010, səh. 200.
