= Sergei Senyuskin =

National Hero of Azerbaijan

- Сенюшкин Сергей Александрович
- Born: September 15, 1957; Syzran, Samara Oblast, Russia
- Died: February 29, 1992 (aged 34); Khojaly, Azerbaijan
- Military career
- Allegiance: Azerbaijan
- Branch: Azerbaijani Armed Forces
- Service years: 1992
- Conflicts: First Nagorno-Karabakh War
- Awards: National Hero of Azerbaijan; 1992

Sergei Alexandrovich Senyuskin (Azerbaijani: Sergey Senyuşkin; Russian: Сенюшкин Сергей Александрович; 15 September 1957 – 29 February 1992) was a National Hero of Azerbaijan and warrior during the First Nagorno-Karabakh War.

== Early life and education ==
Senyuskin was born on 15 September 1957 in Syzran, Samara Oblast, Russia. In 1974, he completed his secondary education at Syzran city secondary school. Senyuskin entered Polytechnic Institute in Syzran, and later in 1975 he continued his education at the Higher Military Aircraft School. In 1979, he successfully completed his education.

=== Personal life ===
Senyuskin was married and had two children.

== First Nagorno-Karabakh War ==
Senyuskin moved to Azerbaijan and devoted the rest of his live to this country. He was appointed the commander of one of the military units in Azerbaijan. Senyuskin is considered to be one of the creators of the Azerbaijani Air Force and also involved in many military operations in Nagorno-Karabakh.

On February 26, 1992, when the Armenians committed crimes in Khojaly Khojaly, Senyuskin helped town inhabitants to evacuate from the city and initially died in a battle with Armenian soldiers on February 29, 1992.

== Honors ==
Sergei Alexandrovich Senyuskin was posthumously awarded the title of the "National Hero of Azerbaijan" by Presidential Decree No. 204 dated 14 September 1992.

He was buried at a cemetery in Syzran, Samara Oblast, Russia. A street in Baku was named after him.

== See also ==
- First Nagorno-Karabakh War
- List of National Heroes of Azerbaijan

== Sources ==
- Vugar Asgarov. Azərbaycanın Milli Qəhrəmanları (Yenidən işlənmiş II nəşr). Bakı: "Dərələyəz-M", 2010, səh. 255.
