= Aşağı Qılıçbağ =

Aşağı Qılıçbağ Aşağı Qılıçbağ
- Location within Azerbaijan Location within Karabakh Economic Region
- Coordinates: 39°56′31″N 46°49′45″E
- Country: Azerbaijan
- District: Khojaly
- Elevation: 525 m (1,722 ft)
- Time zone: UTC+4 (AZT)

Aşağı Qılıçbağ (Ashaghy Gilichbagh) is a village in the Khojaly District of Azerbaijan. Prior to the 2023 Azerbaijani offensive, it was de facto controlled by the Republic of Artsakh.
