= Yalobakənd =

- Location within Azerbaijan Location within Karabakh Economic Region
- Coordinates: 39°48′42.5″N 46°39′47.0″E
- Country: Azerbaijan
- District: Khojaly
- Time zone: UTC+4 (AZT)

Yalobakənd (Yalobakend) is a ghost village in the Khojaly District of Azerbaijan. Prior to the 2023 Azerbaijani offensive, it was de facto controlled by the Republic of Artsakh. Currently the village remains inhabited.
