= Suncinka =

- Location in Azerbaijan Suncinka (Karabakh Economic Region)
- Coordinates: 39°56′36″N 46°44′11″E
- Country: Azerbaijan
- District: Khojaly
- Time zone: UTC+4 (AZT)

Suncinka (Sunjinka) is a village in the Khojaly District of Azerbaijan. It was controlled by the separatist Republic of Artsakh until the end of September 2023.

The village of Suncinka is on the slope of the Karabakh Ridge. The residential facility was named so because it is located near the Sunca River.

From 1992 to 2020, it was under the occupation of the Armenian Armed Forces. In accordance with the trilateral statement of November 10, 2020, signed based on the results of the second Karabakh War, the village of Suncinka came under the control of the Russian peacekeeping forces.
