= Cavadlar =

- Location within Azerbaijan Location within Karabakh Economic Region
- Coordinates: 39°49′07.7″N 46°40′23.8″E
- Country: Azerbaijan
- District: Khojaly
- Time zone: UTC+4 (AZT)

Cavadlar (Javadlar) is a ghost village in the Khojaly District of Azerbaijan. Prior to the 2023 Azerbaijani offensive, it was de facto controlled by the Republic of Artsakh.
