= Janpolad Rzayev =

Azerbaijani soldier

- Born: February 26, 1968; Agdam District, Azerbaijan SSR
- Died: February 26, 1992 (aged 24); Khojaly
- Military career
- Allegiance: Republic of Azerbaijan
- Conflicts: First Nagorno-Karabakh War
- Awards: National Hero of Azerbaijan; 1992

Janpolad Yagub ogly Rzayev (Azerbaijani: Canpolad Rzayev) (26 February 1968, in Agdam District, Azerbaijan SSR – 26 February 1992, in Khojaly) was a recipient of the National Hero of Azerbaijan who fought during the First Nagorno-Karabakh War in the early 1990s.

== Early life and education ==
Rzayev was born on 26 February 1968 in Chukhurmakhla village of Agdam District of Azerbaijan SSR. He completed his secondary education at Ahmedavar village secondary school. From 1988 through 1990, Rzayev served in the Soviet Armed Forces and received the rank of lieutenant. When the First Nagorno-Karabakh War started, Rzayev returned to Azerbaijan and voluntarily went to the front-line.

=== Personal life ===
Rzayev was married and had two children.

== Nagorno-Karabakh war ==
Rzayev participated in battles around the Khramort, Khanabad, Askeran and Karakand villages. Khojaly was captured by ethnic Armenian forces on 26 February 1992 during the First Nagorno-Karabakh War. At least 161 ethnic Azerbaijani civilians from the town of Khojaly were killed by Armenian soldiers on 26 February 1992. Janpolad voluntarily went to the Khojaly to help hundreds of Azerbaijani civilians fleeing from the town.

== Honors ==
Janpolad Yagub ogly Rzayev was posthumously awarded the title of the "National Hero of Azerbaijan" by Presidential Decree No. 833 dated 7 June 1992.

He was buried at a Martyrs' Lane cemetery in Agdam District.

== Sources ==
- Vugar Asgarov. Azərbaycanın Milli Qəhrəmanları (Yenidən işlənmiş II nəşr). Bakı: "Dərələyəz-M", 2010, səh. 248.

== See also ==
- First Nagorno-Karabakh War
- National Hero of Azerbaijan
