= Canhəsən =

- Location within Azerbaijan Location within Karabakh Economic Region
- Coordinates: 39°49′59.9″N 46°41′34.0″E
- Country: Azerbaijan
- District: Khojaly
- Time zone: UTC+4 (AZT)

Canhəsən (Janhasan) is a ghost village in the Khojaly District of Azerbaijan. Prior to the 2023 Azerbaijani offensive, it was de facto controlled by the Republic of Artsakh.
