= Hikmet Nazarli =

National Hero of Azerbaijan

- Hikmət Nəzərli
- Born: March 7, 1966; Baku, Azerbaijan SSR
- Died: February 26, 1992 (aged 25); Khojaly, Azerbaijan
- Military career
- Allegiance: Azerbaijan
- Branch: Azerbaijani Armed Forces
- Service years: 1992
- Conflicts: First Nagorno-Karabakh War
- Awards: National Hero of Azerbaijan; 1992

Hikmet Baba oglu Nazarli (Azerbaijani: Hikmət Nəzərli) (7 March 1966, Baku, Azerbaijan SSR - 26 February 1992, Khojaly, Azerbaijan) was a National Hero of Azerbaijan and warrior during the First Nagorno-Karabakh War.

== Early life and education ==
Nazarli was born on 7 March 1966 in Baku, Azerbaijan SSR. In 1973, he went to the Secondary School No. 27 in Xətai raion, and then moved to Tashkent because of his father's job. In 1982 he returned to Baku again. He was drafted to the Soviet Armed Forces in 1984. Nazarli did his military service in Georgia and was discharged from the army in 1986. He started to work at the Fire Protection Service of the Ministry of Internal Affairs of Azerbaijan.

=== Personal life ===
Nazarli was married and had one child.

== First Nagorno-Karabakh War ==
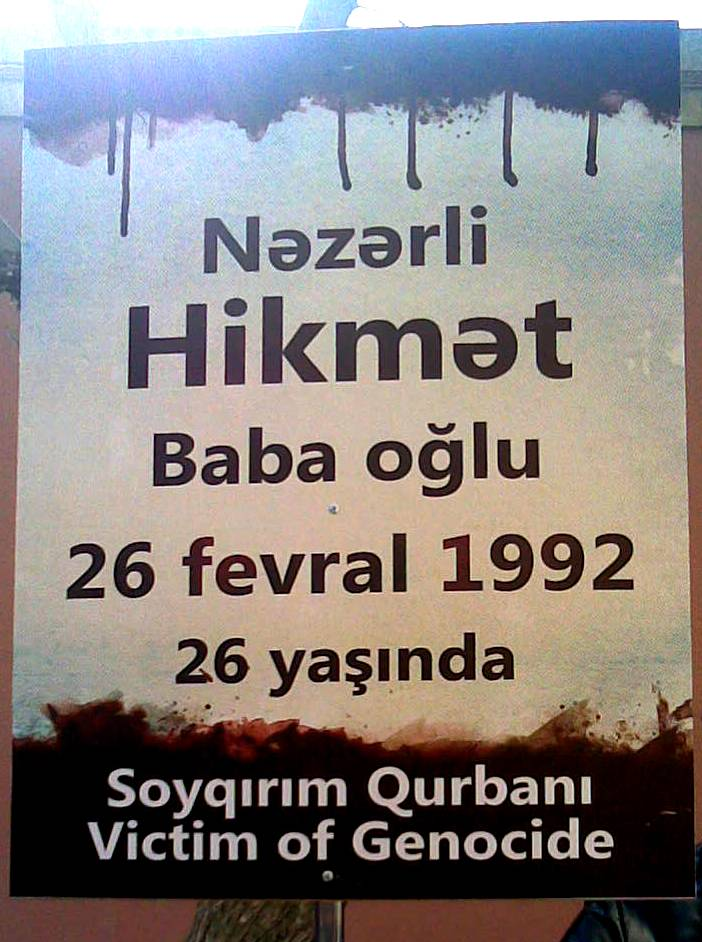

When the First Nagorno-Karabakh War started, Nazarli voluntarily joined the Azerbaijani Armed Forces and went to the front-line. He participated in battles around the villages of Agdam District.

On February 26, 1992, during the Khojaly massacre, Nazarli helped town inhabitants to evacuate from the city. After that battle, Nazarli and his friends moved towards the forests and since that time there is no information about any of them.

== Honors ==
Hikmet Baba oglu Nazarli was posthumously awarded the title of "National Hero of Azerbaijan" by Presidential Decree No. 178 dated 9 September 1992.

== See also ==
- First Nagorno-Karabakh War
- List of National Heroes of Azerbaijan

== Sources ==
- Vugar Asgarov. Azərbaycanın Milli Qəhrəmanları (Yenidən işlənmiş II nəşr). Bakı: "Dərələyəz-M", 2010, səh. 230.
