= Selimov =

Selimov (Cyrillic: Селимов) is a Turkic masculine surname, its feminine counterpart is Selimova. The surname may refer to the following notable people:

- Albert Selimov (born 1986), Russian boxer
- Alim Selimau (born 1983), Belarusian Greco-Roman wrestler
- Araz Selimov (1960–1992), warrior during the Nagorno-Karabakh conflict
- Kevser Selimova, Macedonian folk singer, part of the Selimova-Želčeski duo
- Nermedin Selimov (born 1954), Bulgarian wrestler
- Mustafa Selimov (1910–1985), Crimean Tatar communist party leader in the Soviet Union
