= Alif Hajiyev =

Azerbaijani military officer (1953–1992)

- Born: June 24, 1953; Khojaly, Azerbaijan
- Died: February 26, 1992 (aged 38); Khojaly
- Military career
- Allegiance: Republic of Azerbaijan
- Service years: 1990-1992
- Rank: Major, Commandant of Khojaly Airport
- Commands: Khojaly garrison
- Conflicts: First Nagorno-Karabakh War
- Awards: National Hero of Azerbaijan; 1993

Alif Haciyev Latif oglu (Azerbaijani: Əlif Hacıyev Lətif oğlu) (June 24, 1953 – February 26, 1992) was an Azerbaijani officer, Commandant of Khojaly Airport and National Hero of Azerbaijan.

== Early years ==
Alif Hajiyev was born on June 24, 1953, in Khojaly. From 1971 through 1973, Hajiyev served in Soviet Armed Forces and was stationed in Minsk, Belarus. In 1974–84, he held various positions in Ministry of Internal Affairs of Belorussian SSR and militia of NKAO of Azerbaijan SSR. In December 1990, Alif Hajiyev was appointed head of administration and commandant of Khojaly airport. In December 1991, Hajiyev was promoted to a rank of major.

== Khojaly massacre ==
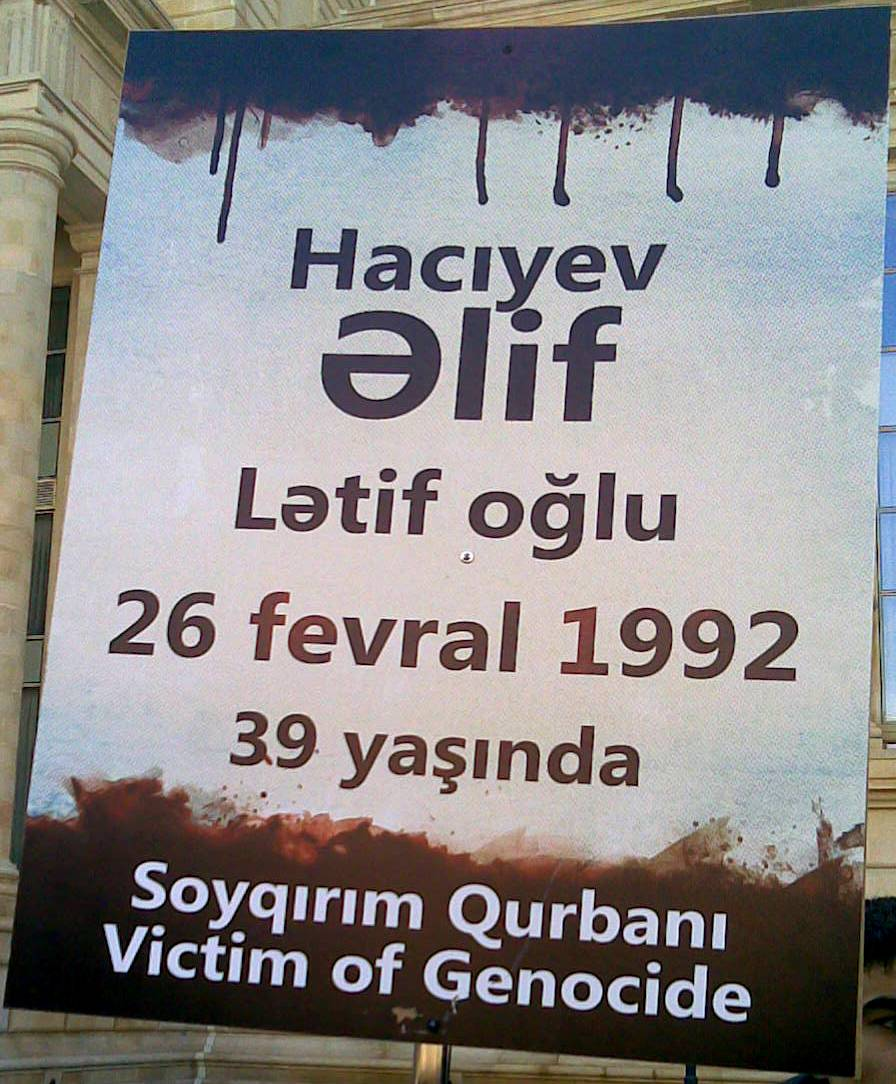
A memorial to Hajiyev

Alif Hajiyev helped the completely surrounded town survive for a few months with no gas and electricity, limited supply of food. When the Armenian offensive from three sides started on February 25, Alif gave an order to evacuate the town. The few defenders along with Hajiyev escorted the crowd of civilians along the Gorgor river valley overnight to the open plain near the village Nakhichevanli, just six miles away from Azerbaijani positions in Şelli village of Aghdam, where the Khojaly Massacre took place on February 26.

=== Death ===
Alif Hajiyev was one of the Azeri combatants escorting hundreds of Azerbaijani civilians fleeing Khojaly. While crossing a road in groups, civilians were defended by Hajiyev who exchanged fire with Armenian troops. While covering the third group, Hajiyev was shot dead while changing magazines. The bullet hit him in the head. Hajiyev was one of 40 defendants of the city which were stationed in Khojaly. Only 10 survived. more than 200 (and potentially up to 1,000) Azerbaijani civilians were killed during the subsequent massacre. Hajiyev was buried in Martyrs' Lane, Baku.

== Honors ==
He was survived by his wife, Gala Hajiyeva. He was posthumously awarded the title of the National Hero of Azerbaijan.

== See also ==
- Khojaly Massacre
- First Nagorno-Karabakh War
- National Hero of Azerbaijan
