= Araz Selimov =

Araz Bahadur oglu Selimov
- Born: 1 June 1960; Khojaly, Azerbaijan SSR, USSR
- Died: 26 February 1992 (aged 31); Askeran, Azerbaijan
- Military career
- Service years: 1988–1992
- Conflicts: Khojaly massacre
- Awards: National Hero of Azerbaijan; 1997

Araz Selimov (1 June 1960 – 26 February 1992) was a warrior during the Nagorno-Karabakh conflict, a National Hero of Azerbaijan and a victim of the Khojaly massacre.

== Early life and education ==
Araz Bahadur oglu Selimov was born in Khojaly district on 1 June 1960. In 1975, he finished his education. In 1978, Selimov joined Soviet army and in 1980, he finished his service and came to his hometown. After army years he started working in the collective farm.

== Family ==
He was married. He had three children. 3 members of his family were killed during Khojaly massacre.

== First Nagorno-Karabakh war ==
In 1988, Selimov joined Khojaly self-defence battalion. This battalion was created by Azerbaijanis against Armenian attacks. During the Khojaly massacre Selim smuggled dozens of civilians from Khojaly.

== Honors ==
Araz Selimov was posthumously awarded the title of the "National Hero of Azerbaijan" by Presidential Decree No. 533 dated 25 February 1997.

He was buried at the Agdam Martyrs' Lane.

== See also ==
- First Nagorno-Karabakh War
- List of National Heroes of Azerbaijan
- Khojaly Massacre
