= Tofig Huseynov =

Azerbaijani soldier

- Born: April 19, 1954; Khojaly, Azerbaijan
- Died: February 26, 1992 (aged 37); Khojaly, Azerbaijan
- Military career
- Allegiance: Republic of Azerbaijan
- Rank: Senior lieutenant
- Conflicts: First Nagorno-Karabakh War
- Awards: National Hero of Azerbaijan; 1992

Tofig Huseynov (Azerbaijani: Tofiq Mirsiyəb oğlu Hüseynov; 19 April 1954 – 26 February 1992) was an Azerbaijani soldier and National Hero of Azerbaijan, He commanded the Khojaly Self-Defence Battalion.

== Biography ==
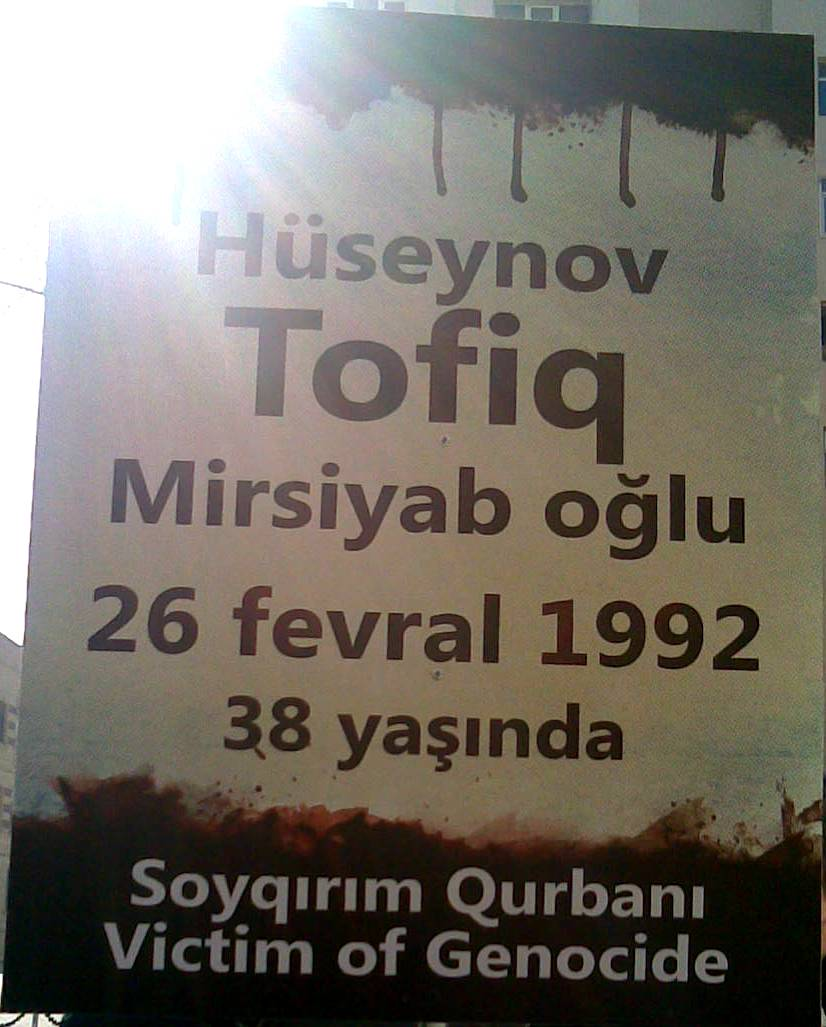
A poster in his honor on the 20th anniversary of his death in 2012.

Huseynov was born on April 19, 1954, in Khojaly, in what was then the Azerbaijan SSR. From 1961 to 1971, he studied at secondary school. Then, he graduated from the local agricultural technical school in the city of Aghdam. From 1974 to 1976 he served in the ranks of the Soviet army in the city of Alma-Ata, the capital of the Kazakh SSR (now Kazakhstan). Returning to his homeland, he taught basic military training at a secondary school in Khojaly.

With the beginning of the First Nagorno-Karabakh War, he took part in the defense of Khojaly. He was one of the founders of the Khojaly Self-Defense Battalion in 1991, and was later appointed commander of this battalion. After an operation in which 10 Armenian servicemen were captured, he was awarded the rank of major. He was a victim of Khojaly massacre, dying on 26 February 1992.

== Legacy ==
By the decree of the President, Huseynov was awarded the title of the National Hero of Azerbaijan (posthumously). He was buried in Martyr's Avenue of Baku.

== See also ==
- National Heroes of Azerbaijan
- Khojaly Massacre

== Links ==
- HÜSEYNOV TOFİQ MİRSİYAB oğlu (in Azerbaijani)
- Хавва Мамедова. Ходжалы. Шехиды и Шахиды(in Russian)
- Список погибших в Ходжалинской резне (in Russian)
- Список погибших во время Ходжалинской трагедии. Управление делами Президента Азербайджанской Республики. ПРЕЗИДЕНТСКАЯ БИБЛИОТЕКА(in Russian)
