= Mike Bucchianeri =

American football player (1917–1992)

Profile
- Position: Guard

Personal information
- Born: January 9, 1917; Van Voorhis, Pennsylvania, U.S.
- Died: February 19, 1992 (aged 75); Ocala, Florida, U.S.
- Listed height: 5 ft 10 in (1.78 m)
- Listed weight: 212 lb (96 kg)

Career information
- High school: Monongahela (PA)
- College: Indiana

Career history
- Green Bay Packers (1941, 1944–1945)

Awards and highlights
- NFL champion (1944)
- Stats at Pro Football Reference

Amadeo Roger "Mike" Bucchianeri (January 9, 1917 – February 19, 1992) was an American professional football guard in the National Football League (NFL) for the Green Bay Packers. He played college football at Indiana University.

Bucchianeri began his football career at Monongahela High School where he graduated in 1937. Born January 9, 1917, the son of a coalminer, he went on to college at Indiana University playing football four years as an interior lineman as well as earning a Bachelor of Education degree in 1941. It was Bucchianeri who kicked the decisive two extra points in the North's 14–12 victory over the South in the 1940 Blue-Gray Game. For this achievement, he was named Most Valuable Player. He was an All-American and played in the 1941 Chicago Tribune All-Star Game.

Selected by the Green Bay Packers in 1941, he suffered a serious head injury near the end of the season and spent two years with the Packers' affiliate team in Wilmington, Delaware to hone his kicking skills and serve as an assistant line coach.

Bucchianeri returned to Green Bay and helped the Packers win their sixth world championship over the New York Giants in 1944 and retired in 1945. Following his playing career, Bucchianeri became a line coach at St. Norbert College in De Pere, Wisconsin and a high school referee. In 1955, he became the offensive line coach at Marquette University in Milwaukee, Wisconsin.

While playing as a rookie for the Green Bay Packers, he was employed by the Green Bay Drop Forge Company, moving from the shop to automotive sales in Detroit, Michigan. He returned to Green Bay as Farm Implement Sales Manager. He retired in 1983 and moved to Ocala, Florida.

Bucchianeri was inducted into the Mid-Mon Valley All Sports Hall of Fame in 1999 and the Ringgold Rams Hall of Fame in 2010.
