= Noel Webster =

Australian rules footballer (born 1931)

Personal information
- Full name: Noel Arnold Webster
- Born: 9 December 1931; Flemington, Victoria
- Died: 7 February 1992 (aged 60); Endeavour Hills, Victoria
- Height: 178 cm (5 ft 10 in)
- Weight: 74 kg (163 lb)

Playing career^{1}
Years	Club	Games (Goals)
1952	Hawthorn	8 (3)
- ^{1} Playing statistics correct to the end of 1952.

Noel Arnold Webster (9 December 1931 – 7 February 1992) was an Australian rules footballer who played with Hawthorn in the Victorian Football League (VFL). Webster died on 7 February 1992 at the age of 60.
