= Kosalar, Khojaly =

Kosalar
- Location within Azerbaijan Location within Karabakh Economic Region
- Coordinates: 39°48′41″N 46°40′26″E
- Country: Azerbaijan
- District: Khojaly
- Elevation: 1,507 m (4,944 ft)
- Time zone: UTC+4 (AZT)

Kosalar is a village in Khojaly District of Azerbaijan. The village had an Azerbaijani majority prior to their expulsion during the First Nagorno-Karabakh War. It was captured by the separatist Armenian forces in 1992 and was administrated as part of the Askeran Province of the self-proclaimed Republic of Artsakh until the 2023 Azerbaijani offensive.
