= Çuxurməhlə =

- Location within Azerbaijan Location within Karabakh Economic Region
- Coordinates: 39°59′41″N 46°52′46″E
- Country: Azerbaijan
- Rayon: Agdam
- Time zone: UTC+4 (AZT)
  - Summer (DST): UTC+5 (AZT)

Çuxurməhlə (Chukhurmahla) is a village in the Agdam District of Azerbaijan.
