= Hussain Montassir =

Egyptian basketball player (1923–1992)

Personal information
- Full name: Hussein Kamel Montasser
- Nationality: Egyptian
- Born: 2 March 1923 Beni Suef, Egypt
- Died: 14 February 1992 (aged 68) Cairo, Egypt

Sport
- Sport: Basketball
Medal record
Men's basketball
Representing Egypt
FIBA EuroBasket
Bronze medal – third place	1947 Prague	Team competition
Gold medal – first place	1949 Cairo	Team competition
Mediterranean Games
Gold medal – first place	1951 Egypt

Hussain Montassir (Arabic: حسين منتصر; 2 March 1923 – 14 February 1992) was an Egyptian basketball player. He competed in the men's tournament at the 1948 Summer Olympics and the 1952 Summer Olympics.
