= Yavar Aliyev =

National Hero of Azerbaijan

- Yavər Əliyev
- Born: June 27, 1956; Baku, Azerbaijan SSR
- Died: February 29, 1992 (aged 35); Karabakh, Azerbaijan
- Military career
- Allegiance: Azerbaijan
- Branch: Azerbaijani Air and Air Defence Force
- Service years: 1991-1992
- Conflicts: First Nagorno-Karabakh War
- Awards: National Hero of Azerbaijan; 1992

Yavar Yaqub oglu Aliyev (Azerbaijani: Yavər Əliyev) (27 June 1956, Baku, Azerbaijan SSR - 29 February 1992, Karabakh, Azerbaijan) was the National Hero of Azerbaijan and warrior during the First Nagorno-Karabakh War.

== Early life and education ==
Aliyev was born on 27 June 1956 in Baku, Azerbaijan SSR. He completed his secondary education at the Secondary School No. 235 in Pirallahi Island. After completing his education, he was admitted to the Kremenchuk flight college of National Aviation University. Aliyev played an important role in the formation of the Azerbaijani Armed Forces.

== Nagorno Karabakh war ==
When the First Nagorno-Karabakh War started, Aliyev was assigned to participate in military flights. Yavar Aliyev made several flights to Karabakh at Mi-24 helicopter. He died on February 29, 1992, when Armenians shot down his helicopter in one of the battles in Karabakh.

== Honors ==
Yavar Yaqub oglu Aliyev was posthumously awarded the title of the "National Hero of Azerbaijan" by Presidential Decree No. 204 dated 14 September 1992.

He was buried at a Martyrs' Lane cemetery in Baku. A school where he studied in Pirallahi Island and National Aviation Academy were named after him.

=== Personal life ===
Aliyev was married and had two children.

== See also ==
- First Nagorno-Karabakh War
- List of National Heroes of Azerbaijan

== Sources ==
- Vugar Asgarov. Azərbaycanın Milli Qəhrəmanları (Yenidən işlənmiş II nəşr). Bakı: "Dərələyəz-M", 2010, səh. 91.
