= Stepanakert Airport =

Airport in Khojaly, Azerbaijan

Stepanakert Airport / Khojaly Airport Ստեփանակերտի օդակայան / Xocalı Hava Limanı
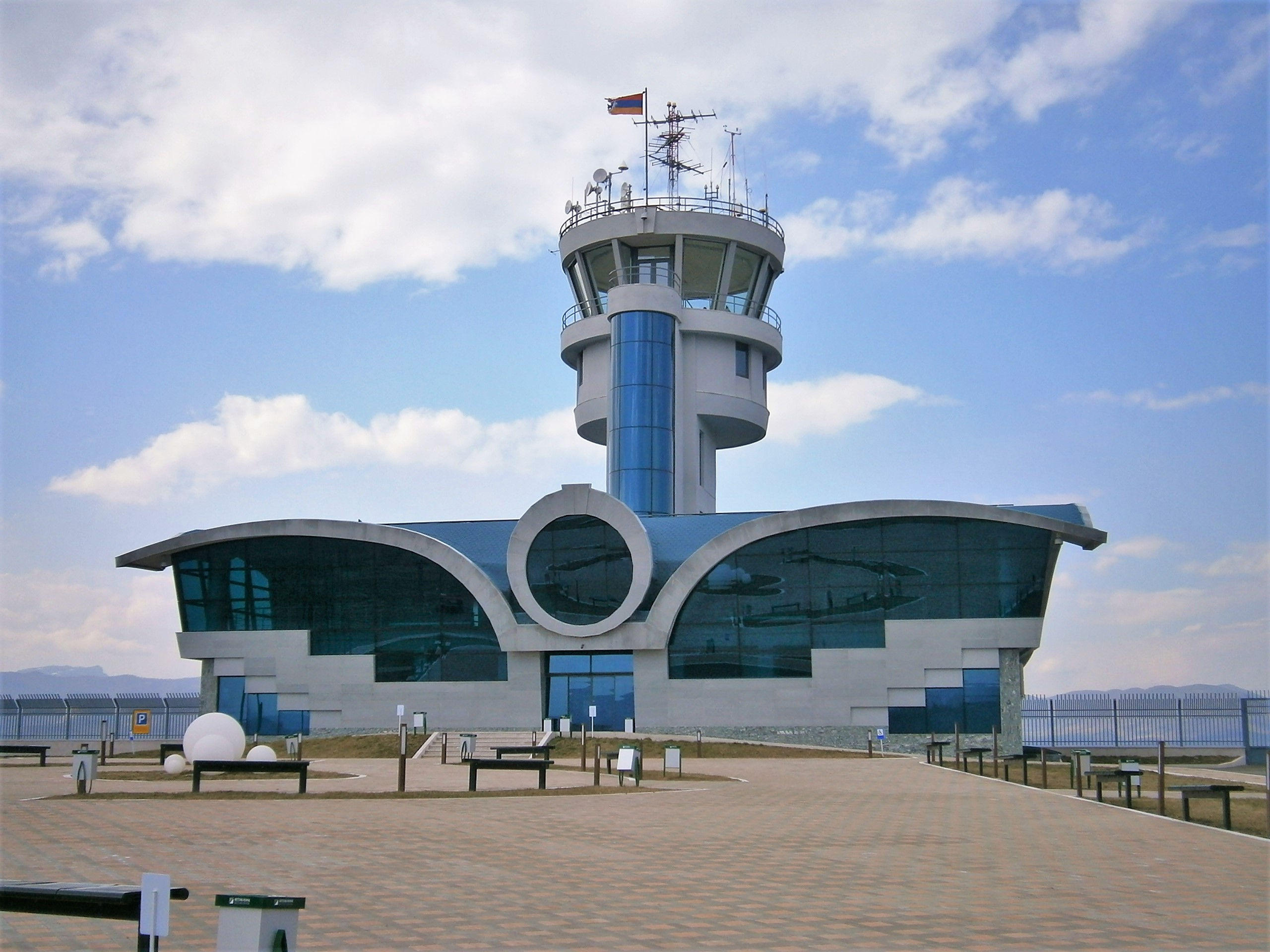
- IATA: none; ICAO: UBBS

Summary
- Airport type: Military and civilian
- Location: Khankendi, Azerbaijan
- Elevation AMSL: 2,001 ft (610 m)
- Coordinates: 39°54′05″N 46°47′13″E

Map
- Location of the Airport Khankendi (Karabakh Economic Region)

Runways
Direction	Length		Surface
Direction	m	ft	Surface
05/23	2,178	7,145	Asphalt
- Source: DAFIF

Stepanakert Airport (Armenian: Ստեփանակերտի Օդակայան) or Khojaly Airport (Azerbaijani: Xocalı Hava Limanı) is a defunct airport in the town of Khojaly, 10 kilometres (6.2 mi) north-east of Stepanakert, in the Nagorno-Karabakh region of Azerbaijan.

Constructed and active during the Soviet period, the airport ceased operations due to the First Nagorno-Karabakh War in 1990. The airport was under the control of the breakaway Republic of Artsakh from 1992 to 2023; despite certain renovations, the airport was not reopened. Azerbaijan took control of the airport in the 2023 Azerbaijani offensive in Nagorno-Karabakh.

== Facilities ==
The airport is located at an elevation of 610 metres (2,001 ft) above mean sea level. It has one runway designated 05/23 with an asphalt surface measuring 2,178 by 37 metres (7,146 ft × 121 ft).

== History ==
As of late 1980, the airport served regular passenger flights from Yerevan to Stepanakert. With the escalation of the Karabakh conflict, the authorities of the Azerbaijan SSR blockaded the Armenian SSR; the Nagorno-Karabakh Autonomous Oblast (or NKAO) airport was the only means of communication with the outside world from the Karabakh region. The airport was under the control of the Nagorno-Karabakh Republic between 1994 (when the ceasefire agreement of the First Nagorno-Karabakh War was signed) and 2023 (when Azerbaijan took control of the territory on which the airport is located).

=== Renovation ===
In 2009, the construction of a new passenger terminal began. Repair work was also conducted on the main runway. According to Nagorno-Karabakh Republic Urban Development Minister Karen Shahramanian, the terminal building would be completed in November 2010; however this was delayed until April 2011. Air navigation equipment was also installed. The authorities claim that the renovated airport will be capable of receiving 200 passengers every hour.

On April 5, 2011, it was announced that the opening of the airport had been postponed. Dmitry Adbashyan, the head of NKR Civil Aviation Service announced that the airport launch would take place in summer of 2011. NKR officials also insisted that the postponement was not related to the ongoing dispute with Azerbaijan.

=== Reactions ===
Shortly after the Nagorno-Karabakh Republic Civil Aviation Department's statement announcing the May 9, 2011 opening date, Arif Mammadov, director of Azerbaijan's Civil Aviation Administration warned that according to aviation laws, flights from Yerevan to Stepanakert are not authorized and may be shot down.

The NKR response came from David Babayan, head of the central information department of the NKR President's office, who said that the Nagorno-Karabakh Defense Army "will give an adequate response" if Azerbaijan attempts to shoot down an aircraft. President of Armenia Serzh Sargsyan condemned the threat to shoot down civilian aircraft, dismissing it as "nonsense". Sargsyan also said that he would be the first passenger of the inaugural Yerevan-Stepanakert flight.

The Azerbaijani presidential administration condemned Sargsyan's statement as a provocation on the part of Armenia. A few days later, Elkhan Polukhov, spokesman for the Azerbaijani Foreign Ministry, declared that “Azerbaijan did not and will not use force against civil facilities.”

The United States Assistant Secretary, Philip H. Gordon, as well as then ambassadors to Azerbaijan and Armenia, Matthew Bryza and Marie L. Yovanovitch, respectively, characterized Azerbaijan's threat as "unacceptable"; and advised that issues related to the security of the airport should be solved before its opening.

The OSCE Minsk Group, which mediates the conflict, reaffirmed that the operation of this airport could not be used to support any claim of a change in the status of Nagorno-Karabakh, and urged the sides to act in accordance with international law and consistent with current practice for flights over their territory.

The United States ambassador to Azerbaijan Richard Morningstar stated in November 2012 he was "convinced that the functioning of the airport would not help the peace process."

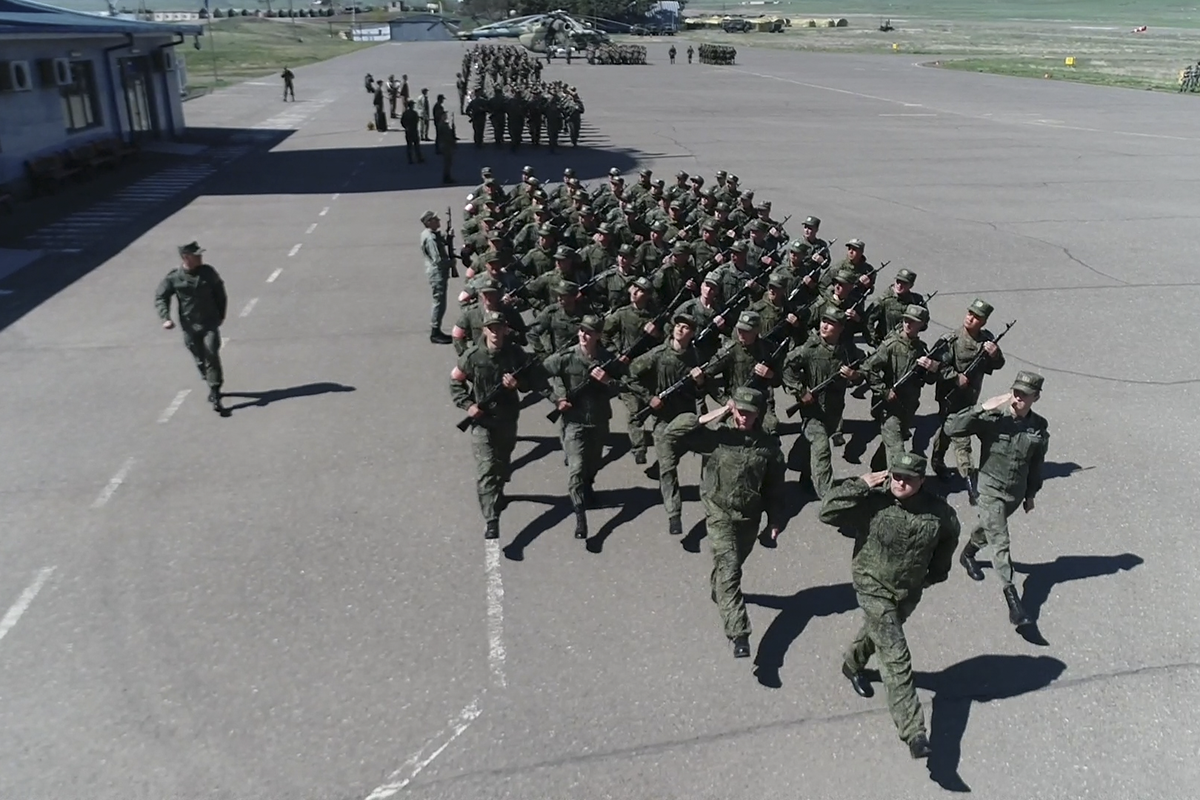
Russian troops marching at the airport.

Turkish Foreign Minister Ahmet Davutoğlu, who stated “that such provocative actions will not serve to promote the peaceful settlement of the Karabakh conflict," and called on Armenia "to stop such provocative steps.” The GUAM's Secretary General Valeri Chechelashvili responded by stating that the airport was within the territorial integrity and sovereignty of Azerbaijan and can not operate without Azerbaijan's permission.

On April 14, 2011, 23 members out of 324 from the Parliamentary Assembly of the Council of Europe (PACE) endorsed a declaration condemning "the construction by Armenia of an airport in the occupied Azerbaijani territories."

The Turkish government condemned the efforts of Armenia to open the airport, and reiterated that it will close its air space to Armenia, if the opening goes ahead.

== Airlines and destinations ==
It was expected that the airport would have regular flight services only to Yerevan, Armenia, with state-owned carrier Artsakh Air. Also referred to as Artsakhavia, the state airline was created on January 26, 2011, and scheduled to operate from the airport beginning in 2017. It had a head office on the grounds of the airport. It intended to purchase three Bombardier CRJ200 jets in 2011. Officials have only stated that a one-way air ticket to the Armenian capital would cost 16,000 drams (US$45). However, flights did not get started.

== See also ==
- Transport in the Nagorno-Karabakh Republic
- List of airports in Armenia
- List of airports in Azerbaijan
- Transport in Armenia
- Transport in Azerbaijan
