= Khojaly, Nagorno-Karabakh =

Town in Azerbaijan

Khojaly Xocalı
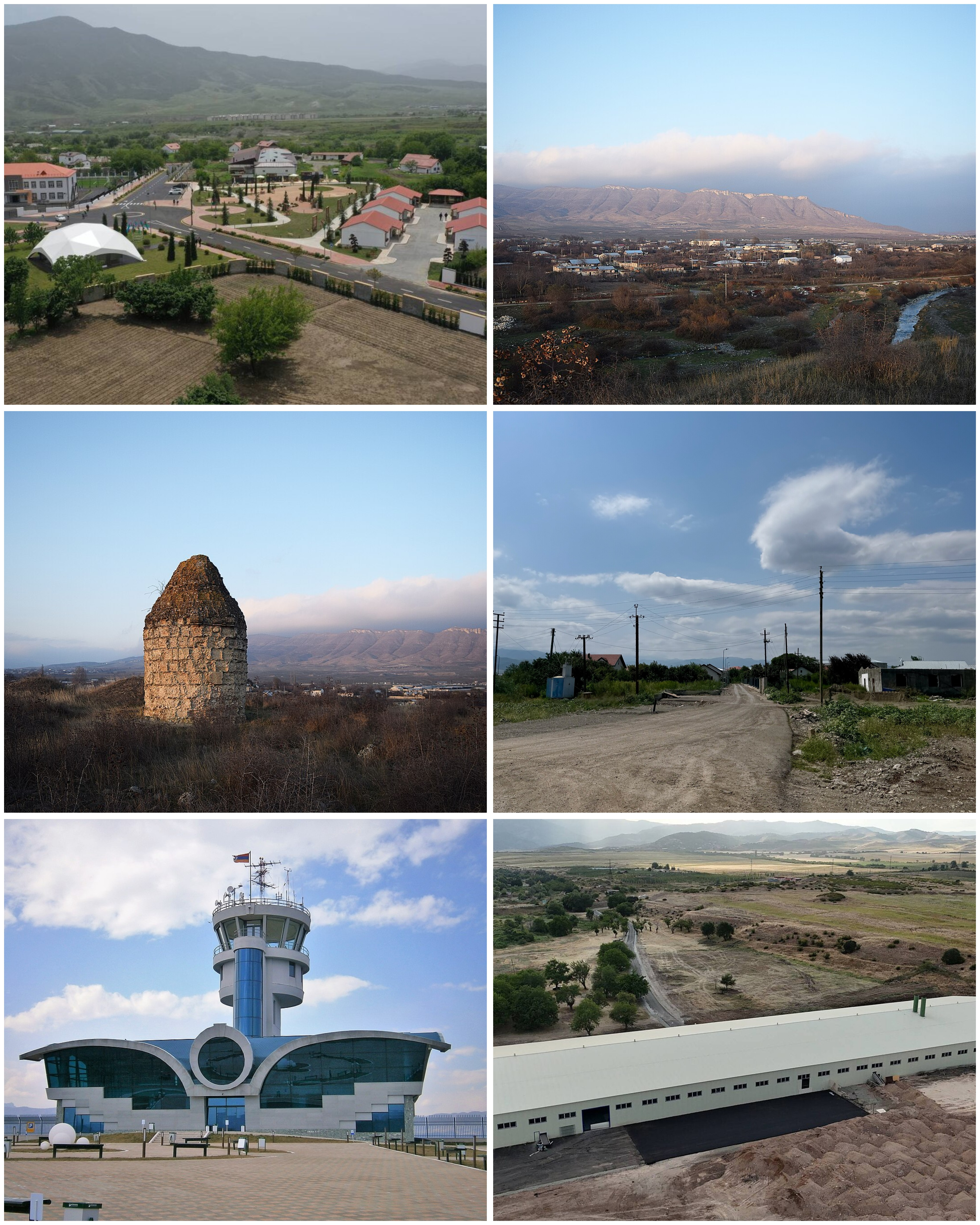
- Clockwise from top: Newly built houses; View of Khojaly; Street in Khojaly; Brick factory; Stepanakert Airport; Azerbaijani mausoleum

- Location within Azerbaijan Location within Karabakh Economic Region
- Coordinates: 39°54′40″N 46°47′21″E
- Country: Azerbaijan
- District: Khojaly
- Elevation: 570 m (1,870 ft)

Population (2026)
  - Total: 651
- Time zone: UTC+4 (UTC)

Khojaly (Azerbaijani: Xocalı,; Armenian: Խոջալու, romanized: Khojalu) is a town in the Khojaly District of Azerbaijan, in the region of Nagorno-Karabakh.

The town was the second largest Azerbaijani town in the former Nagorno-Karabakh Autonomous Oblast until the mass killing and exodus of its Azerbaijani population during the First Nagorno-Karabakh War.

Stepanakert Airport is located to the immediate south of the town.

== Toponymy ==
The Azerbaijani name of the town, Khojaly, derives from khoja (xoca), which is the Azerbaijani spelling of the Persian word khawaja, meaning master.

In 2001 the settlement was renamed Ivanyan (Իվանյան) by Artsakh, after the late general of the Artsakh Defence Army, Kristapor Ivanyan.

== History ==
According to the 1910 publication of the Caucasian Calendar, Khojaly had 184 Tatar (i.e. Azerbaijani) inhabitants in 1908. In the 1912 publication, Khojaly had 172 Tatar and 52 Russian inhabitants.

During the Soviet period, Khojaly was a village in the Askeran District of the Nagorno-Karabakh Autonomous Oblast.

=== First Nagorno-Karabakh War ===
As the First Nagorno-Karabakh War started, the Azerbaijani government began to implement a plan to create a new district center. From 1988 to 1990 the population of Khojaly increased from 2,135 to 6,000 residents, mostly consisting of immigrants from Soviet Central Asia (including more than 2,000 Meskhetian Turks) and immigrants from Armenia (about 2,000). In April 1990 the Azerbaijani government abolished the Nagorno-Karabakh Autonomous Oblast and its internal divisions. Khojaly was given city status and became the regional center for the newly created Khojaly District composed of the former Askeran District and part of the Martuni District. The town had 6,300 Azerbaijani inhabitants in 1991.

Most of the inhabitants fled during the town's capture by Armenian forces on 26 February 1992 during the First Nagorno-Karabakh War and hundreds were killed in the Khojaly massacre. The Khojaly massacre was the mass killing of Azerbaijanis — mostly civilians, but also armed troops — by local irregular Armenian forces and the 366th Commonwealth of Independent States Guards Motor Rifle Regiment. It was one of the four events that defined the war, along with the Karabakh Armenian seizure of Shusha and the capture of Lachin and the Lachin corridor between Nagorno-Karabakh and Armenia as well as the June 1992 Azerbaijani offensive against the Mardakert Province in Nagorno-Karabakh. The death toll claimed by the Azerbaijani authorities is 613 civilians, including 106 women and 63 children. According to Human Rights Watch, it resulted in death of at least 200 Azerbaijanis, though it is possible that as many as 500–1,000 may have died.

=== Republic of Artsakh ===
After the First Nagorno-Karabakh War, the town became part of the Askeran Province of the Republic of Artsakh and the town was settled by Armenians.

The town had an Armenian-majority population of 908 inhabitants in 2005, and 1,397 inhabitants in 2015.

After the 2020 Nagorno-Karabakh war, five Armenian families displaced from Vazgenashen (Gulably) settled in the town, as well as in Shosh (Shushikend). Artsakh launched the construction of two new residential districts in the town in 2021, consisting of more than 400 apartments for displaced people from the village of Mets Tagher (Boyuk Taghlar) in the Hadrut Province.

=== Republic of Azerbaijan ===
Khojaly came under Azerbaijani control on 24 September 2023, after the 2023 Azerbaijani offensive in Nagorno-Karabakh. On 15 October 2023, President of the Republic of Azerbaijan Ilham Aliyev raised the Azerbaijani national flag in Khojaly.

On 28 May 2024, Aliyev presented apartment keys to the returning residents of Khojaly.

As of February 2026, 144 Azerbaijani families, totaling 651 individuals, have been resettled in the town by Azerbaijan.

== Historical heritage sites ==
Historical heritage sites in and around the town include burial mounds and fields from the 2nd–1st millennia BCE and a 14th-century tomb. Tombstones from the Late Middle Ages and the 18th century, and a 19th-century Turkic mausoleum are located a few hundred meters to the west of the town.

== Economy and culture ==
The population is mainly engaged in agriculture and animal husbandry. As of 2015, the town has a municipal building, a house of culture, a secondary school, eleven shops, and a medical centre.

== International relations ==
In February 2010, the Azeri-Czech Society reported that representatives of the Azeri administration of Khojaly in exile and the Czech town of Lidice signed an agreement, making Khojaly and Lidice sister cities, and that a street in Lidice was named "Khojaly". In March 2012, reports quoted the mayor of Lidice, Veronika Kellerova, as officially stating that Lidice and Khojaly had never been sister cities. She further repudiated reports that there exists a street named Khojaly in Lidice.

== Gallery ==
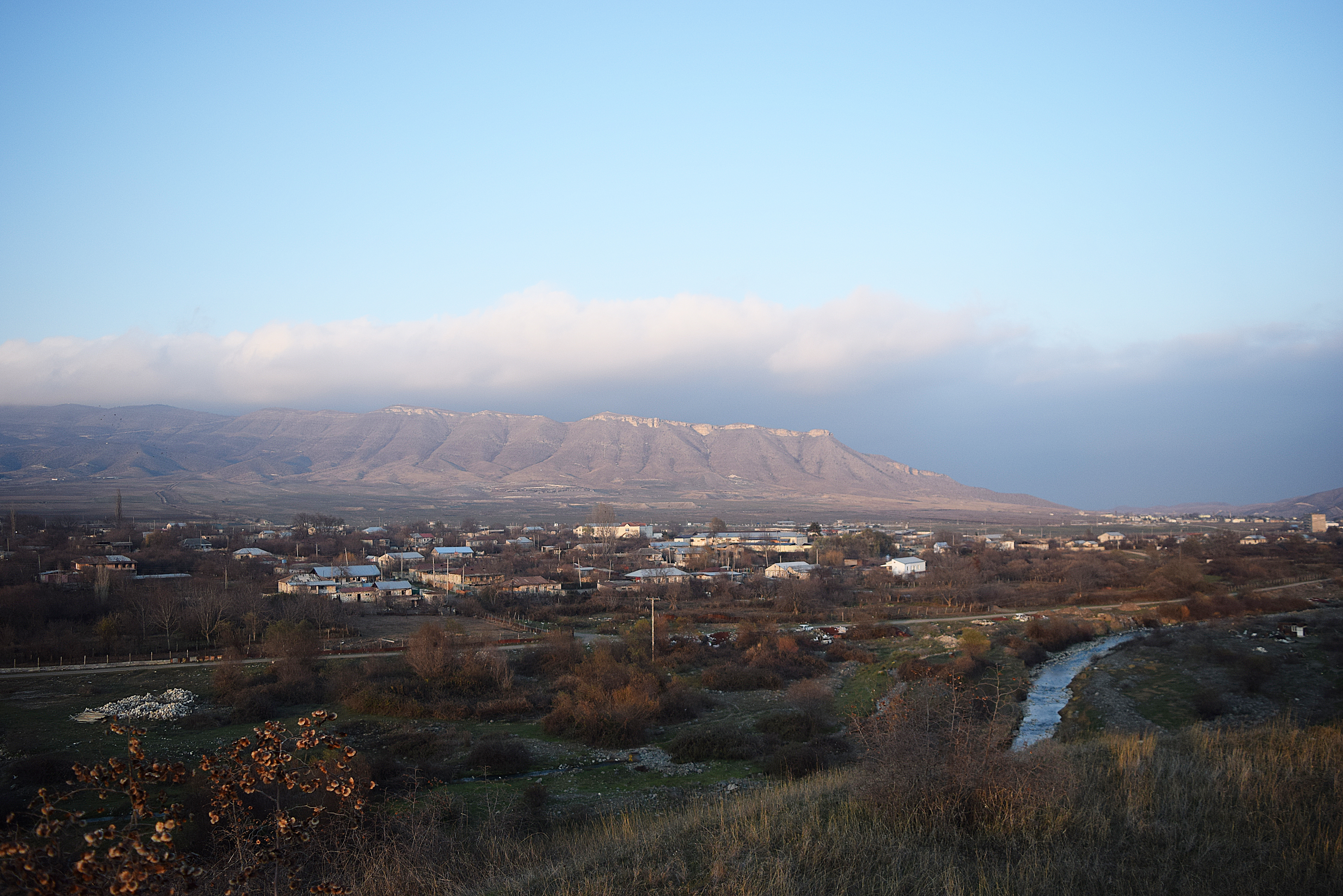
Panorama

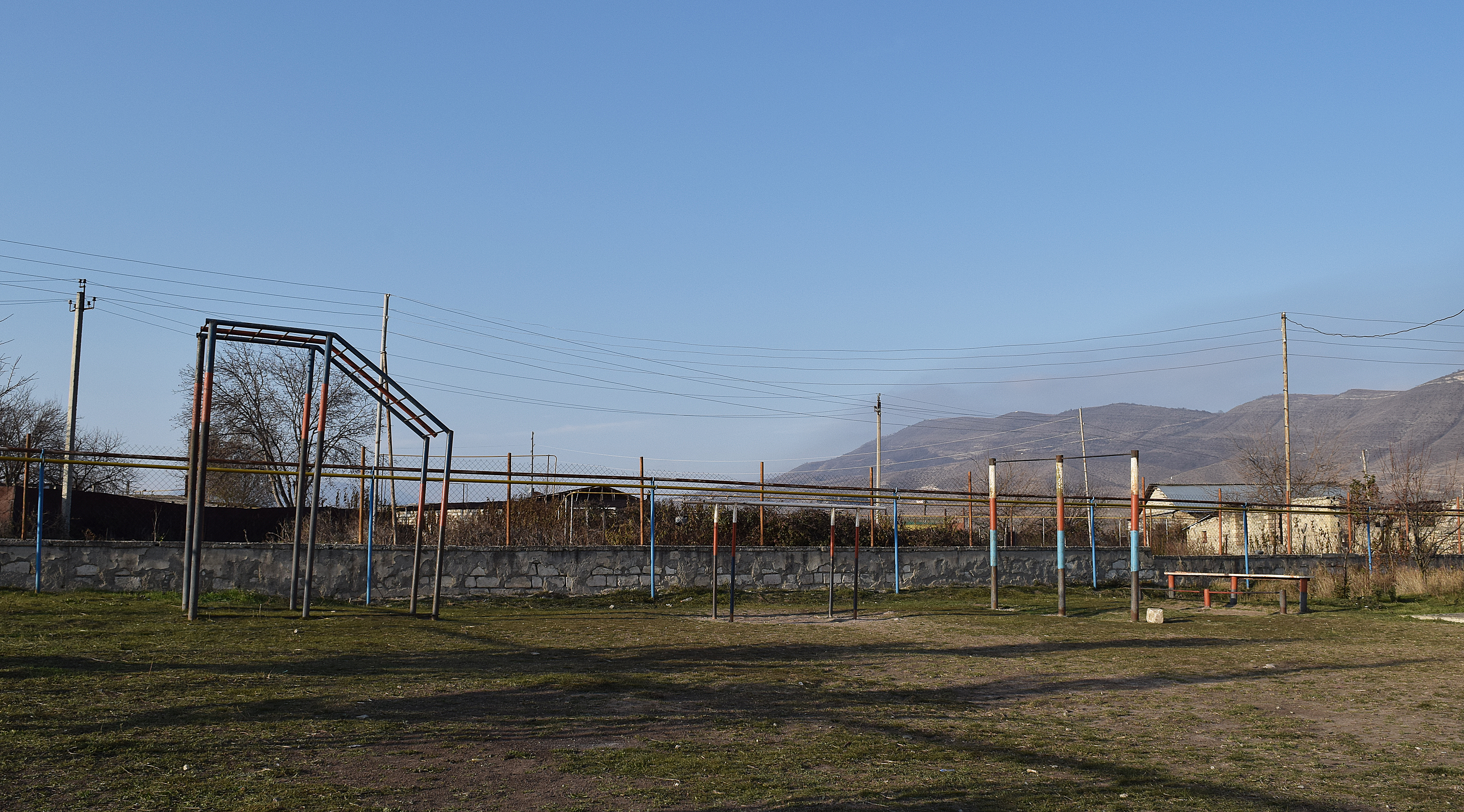
Playground

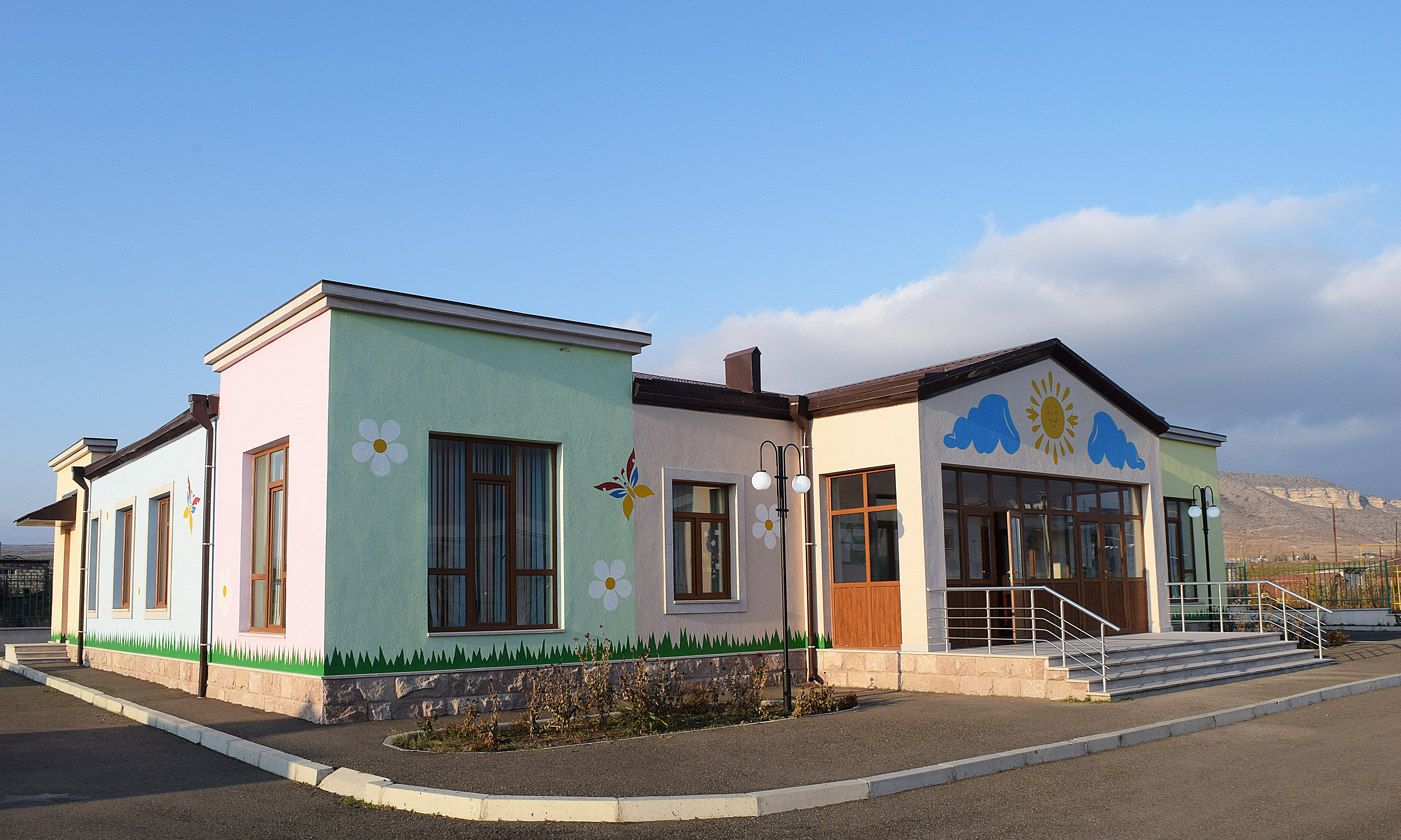
Kindergarten

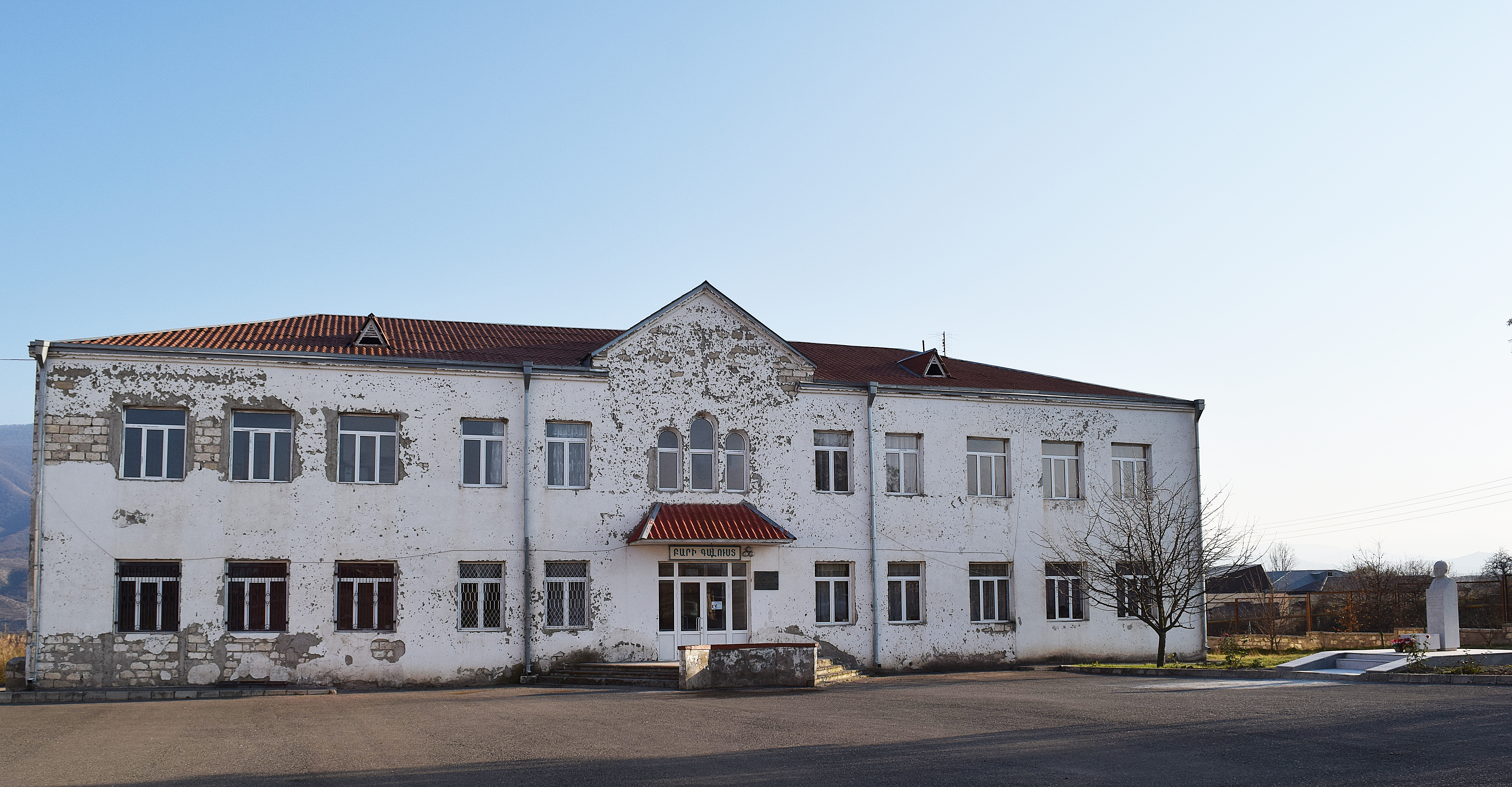
School in the town

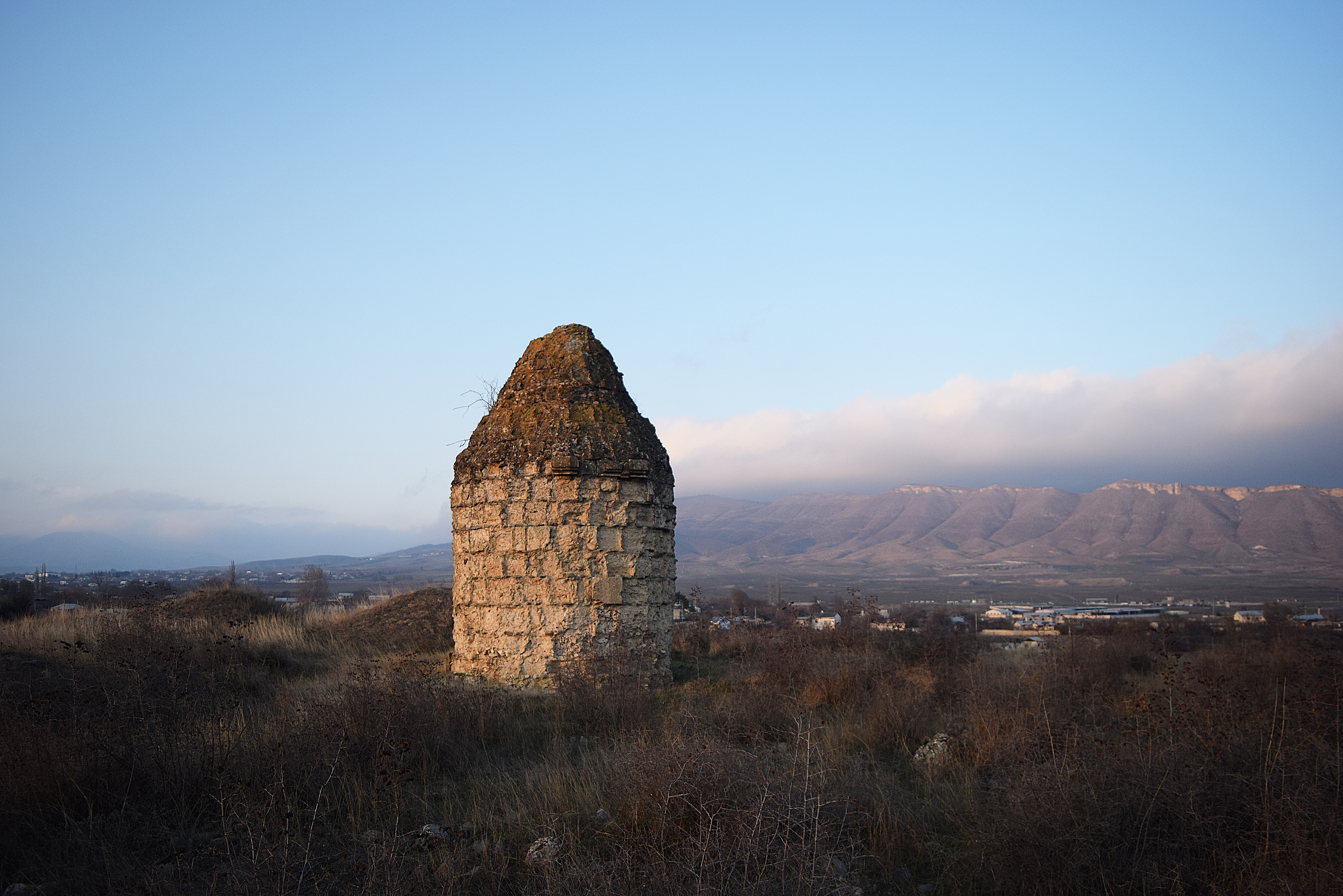
Mausoleum

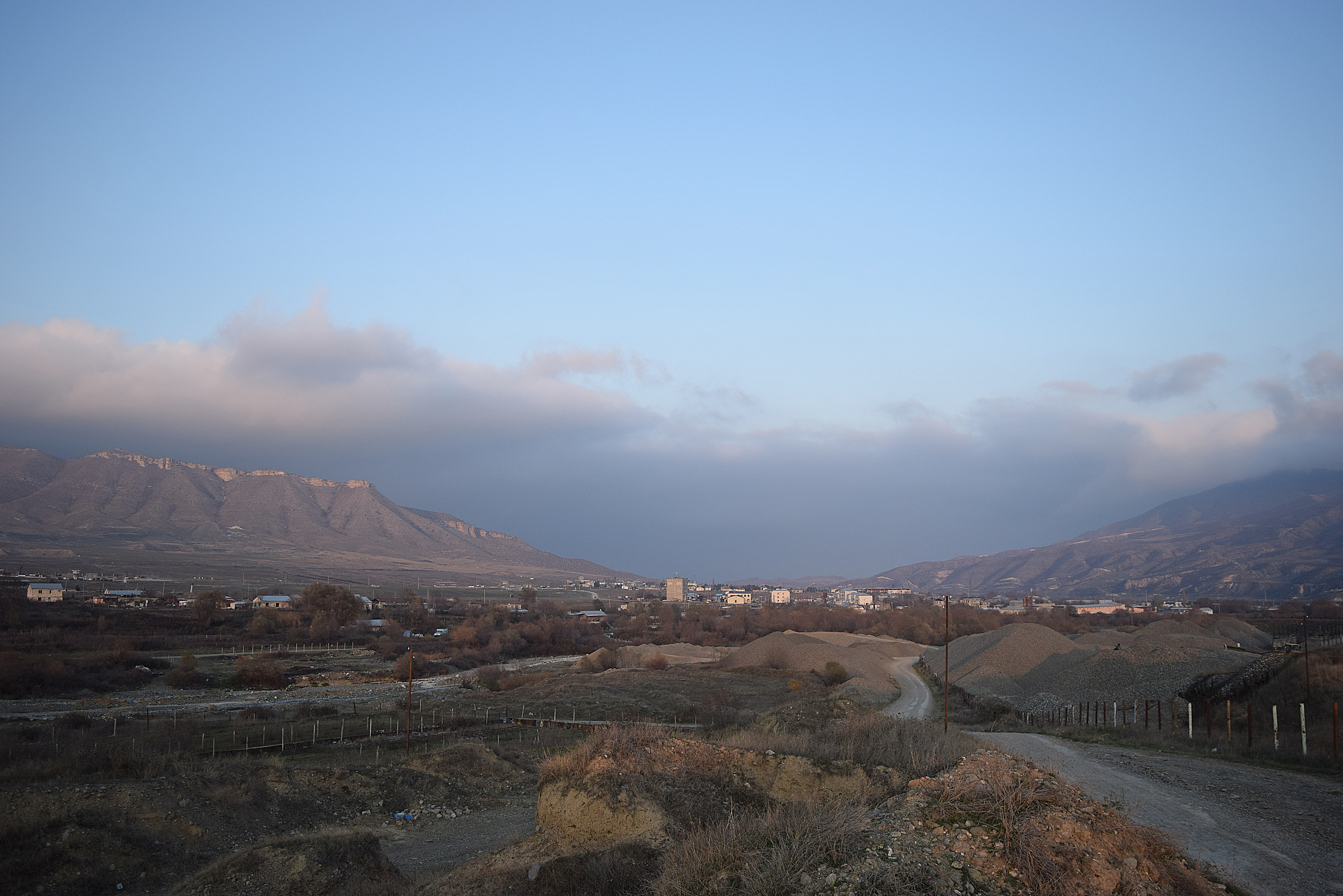
Panorama

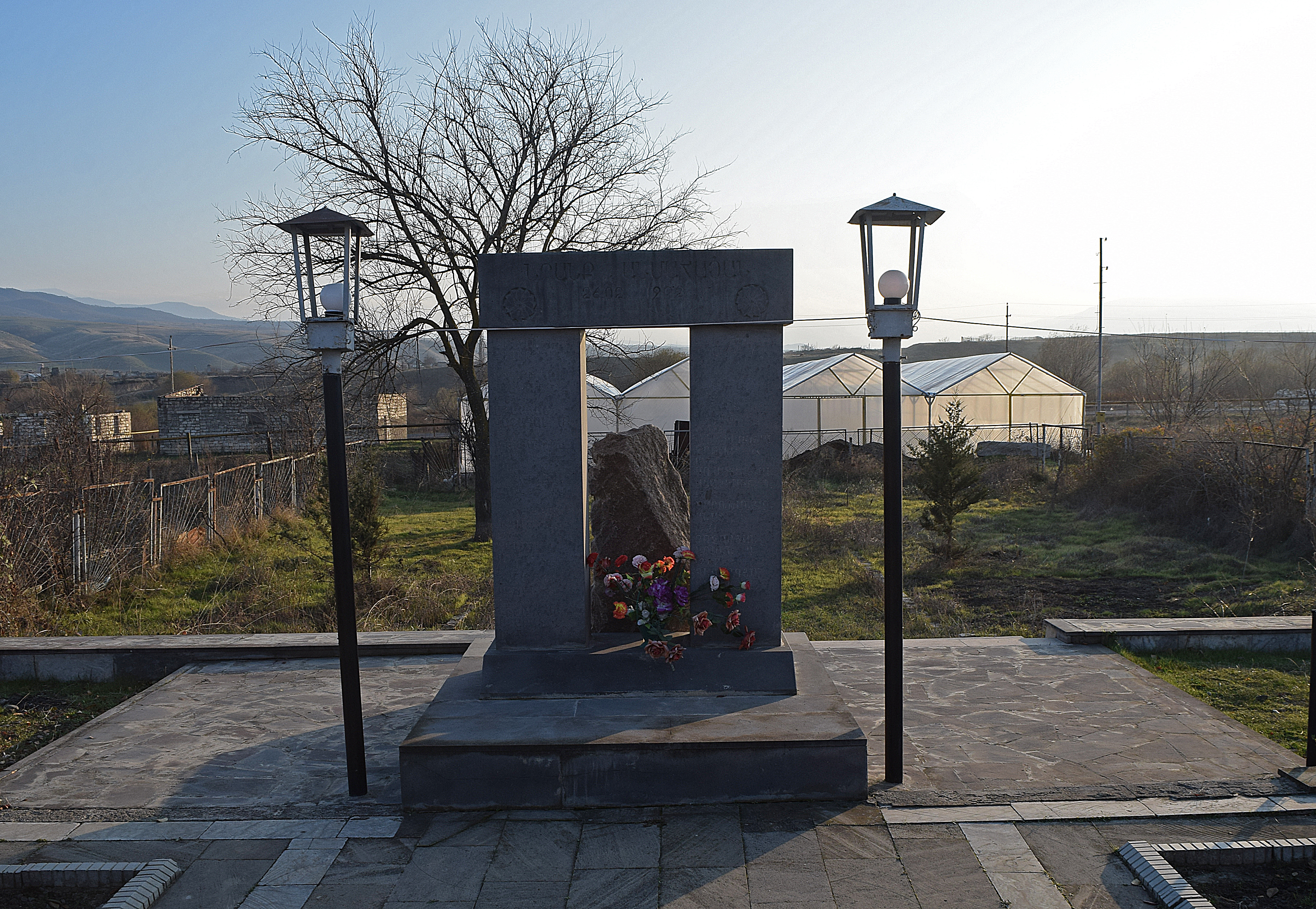
Monument

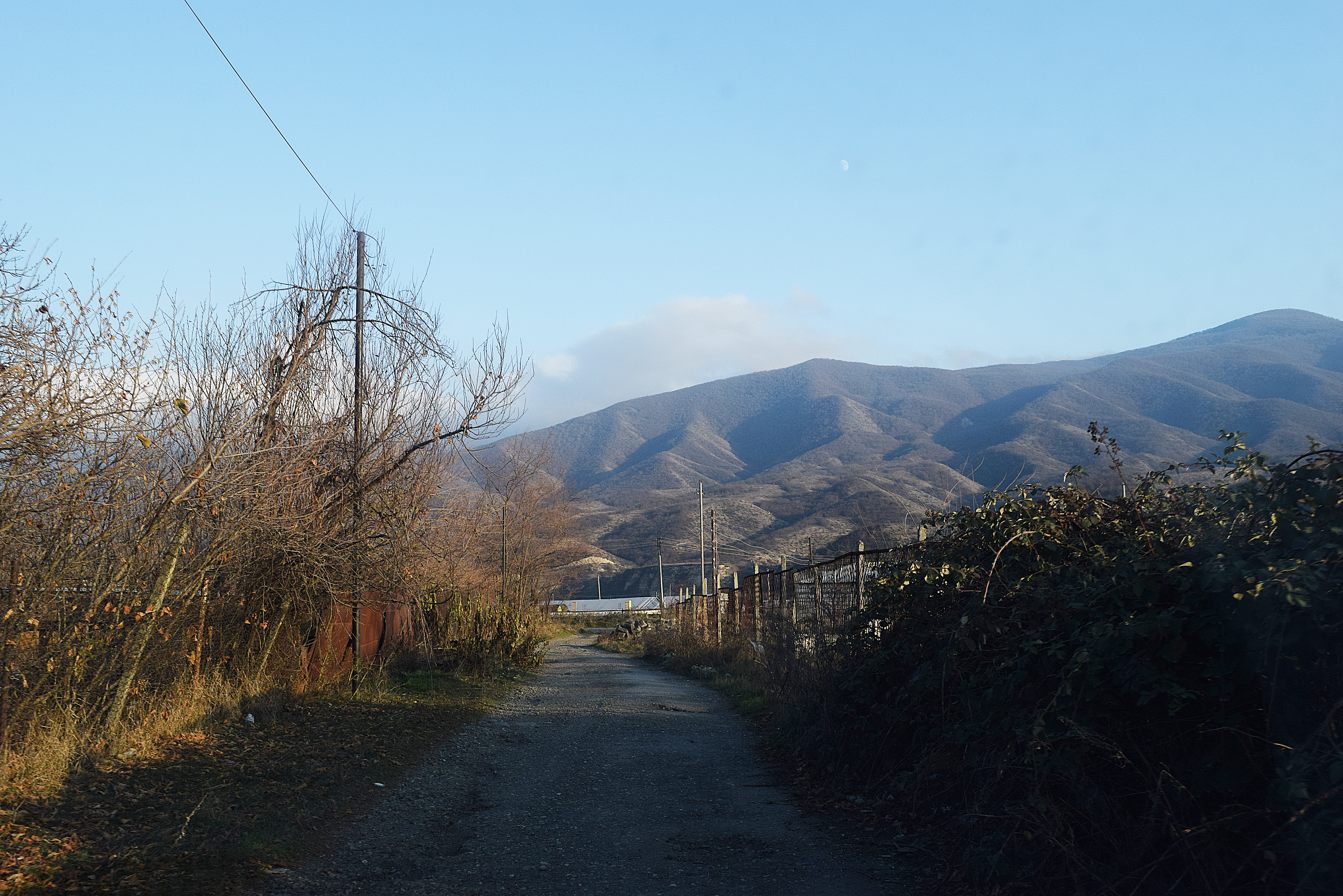
Scenery

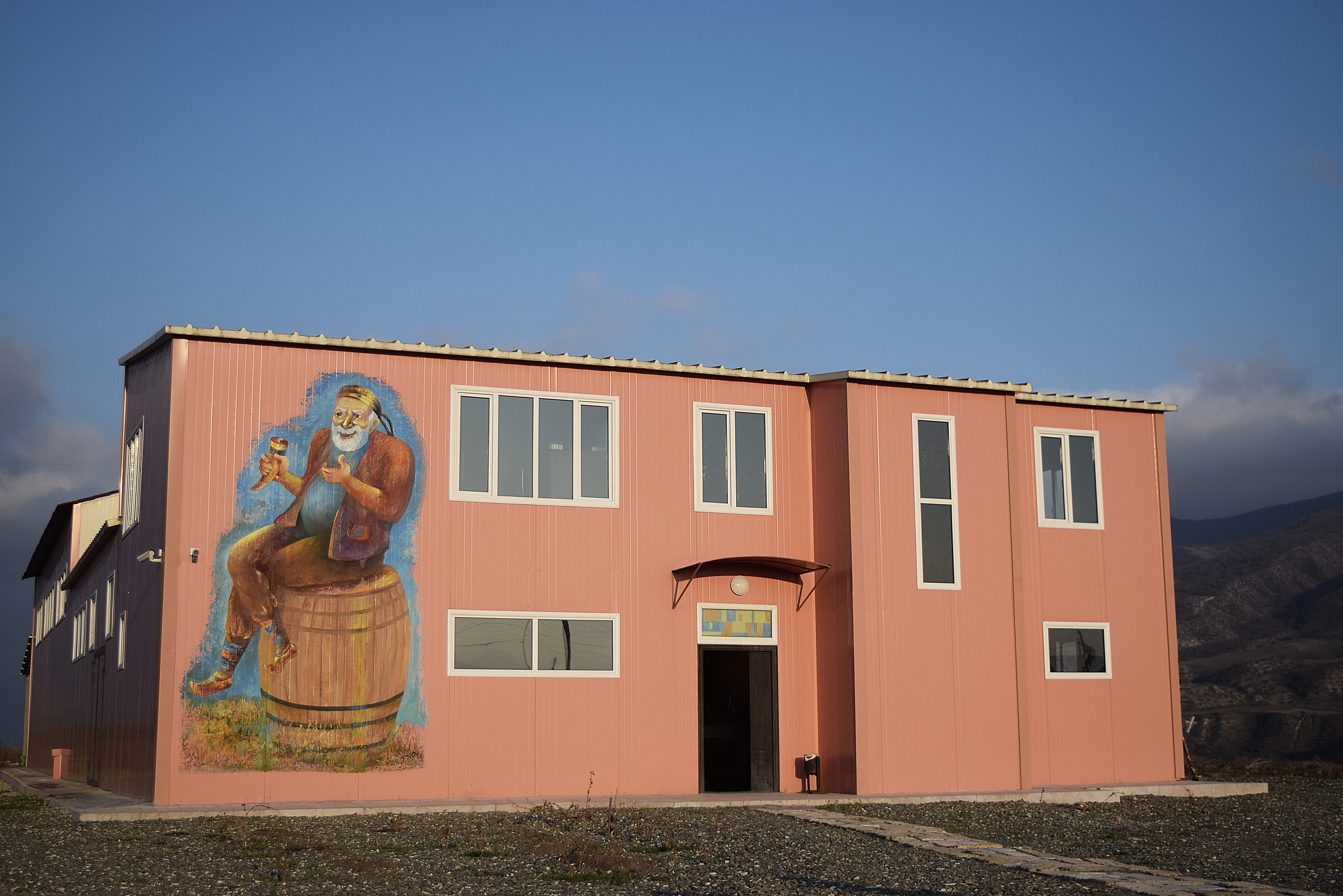
Wine factory

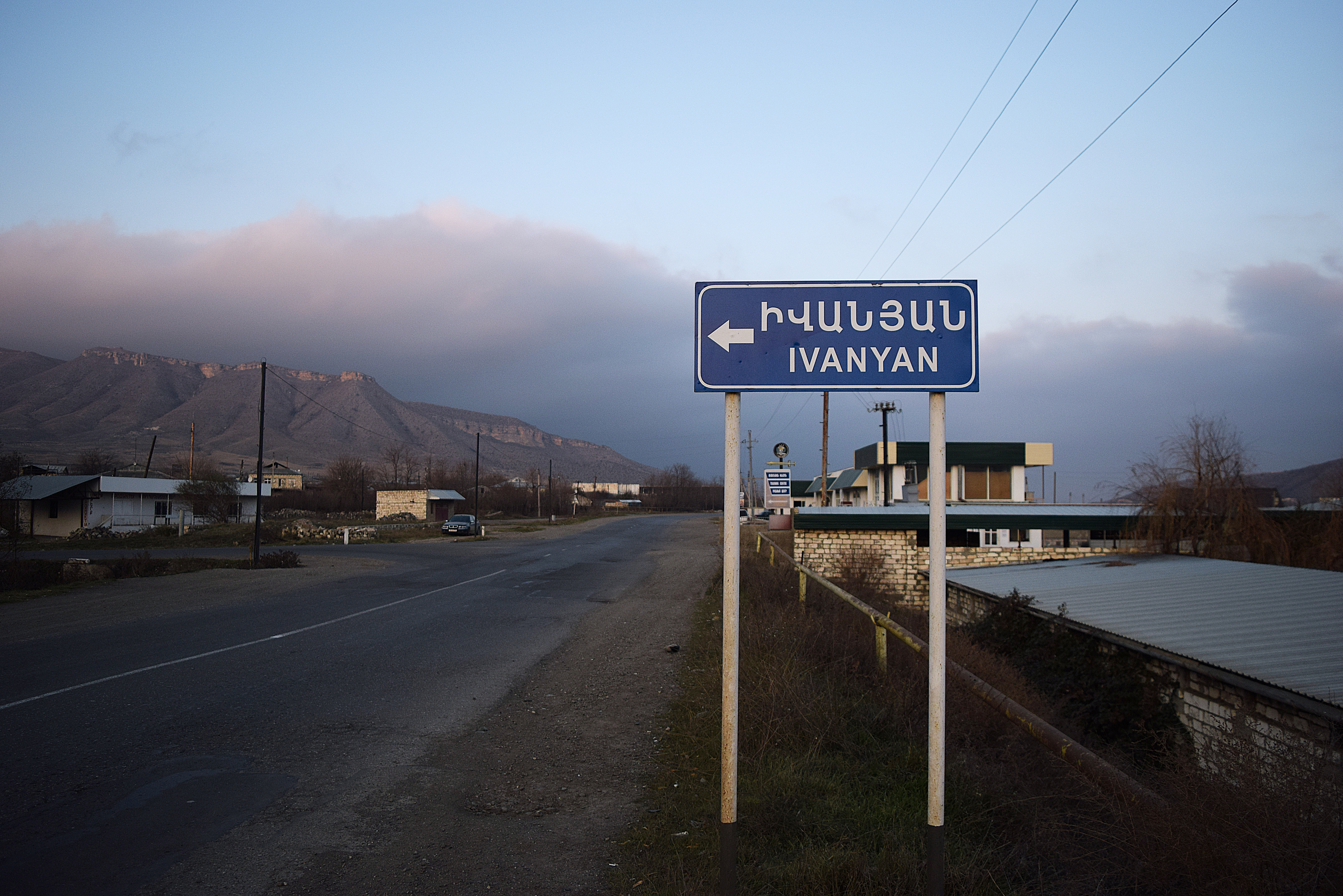
Sign in Armenian at the entrance of the town
