= Khojaly District =

District in western Azerbaijan

Coordinates: 39°54′N 46°47′E

- District
- Map of Azerbaijan showing Khojaly District
- Country: Azerbaijan
- Region: Karabakh
- Established: 26 November 1991
- Capital: Khojaly
- Settlements: 53

Government
  - Governor: Shahmar Usubov

Area
  - Total: 1,000 km^{2} (390 sq mi)

Population (2020)
  - Total: 28,800
  - Density: 29/km^{2} (75/sq mi)
- Time zone: UTC+4 (AZT)
- Postal code: 2600
- Website: xocali-ih.gov.az

Khojaly District (Azerbaijani: Xocalı rayonu) is the district of Azerbaijan. It is located in the west of the country in the Karabakh Economic Region. The district borders the districts of Kalbajar, Lachin, Shusha, Agdam and Khojavend. Its capital and largest city is Khojaly. As of 2020, the district had a nominal population of 28,800.

The centre of the district, the town of Khojaly, was also the site of the Khojaly Massacre, the largest massacre throughout the whole Nagorno-Karabakh conflict. Following the massacre, most of the district was captured and made part of the Askeran Province of the self-proclaimed Republic of Artsakh. Following the 2020 Nagorno-Karabakh war, Azerbaijan recaptured some villages in the district, while most of the district, including its capital, was put under Russian peacekeeping control. After the 2023 Azerbaijani offensive in Nagorno-Karabakh, the entire district fell under the control of Azerbaijan after the capitulation of the Artsakh Defence Army in the area.

== History ==
Khojaly district was established on the basis of the Askeran District of the Nagorno-Karabakh Autonomous Oblast in 1991. It was captured by Armenian forces in 1991–1992.

The district consists of 1 city, 2 settlements and 50 villages in the district. It was once a site of prehistoric Khojaly-Gadabay culture.

== Geography ==
Khojaly district is located in Nagorno-Karabakh. The territory of the district is mountainous. The highest altitudes are Qirkhqiz and Gizgala, the main rivers are Gargar and Badara. The climate is mild-hot except the mountainous area.

== Notable figures ==
- Ramil Usubov – the former Minister of Internal Affairs of Republic of Azerbaijan.;
- Elman Mammadov – Azerbaijani politician who serves as the Member of National Assembly of Azerbaijan from 124th Shusha-Fuzuli-Khojaly-Khojavend district. He's a veteran of the First Nagorno-Karabakh War.
- Alif Hajiyev – Azerbaijani officer, Commandant of Khojaly Airport and National Hero of Azerbaijan.
- Tofig Huseynov – Azerbaijani army commander.
- Pele Pughi – 18th century Armenian satirist and fabulist.

== See also ==
- Khojaly massacre
- Kosalar
- Lachin
- Kalbajar
- Aghdam
- Shusha
