= Khojaly massacre =

1992 mass killing of Azerbaijanis during the First Nagorno-Karabakh War

Coordinates: 39°54′40″N 46°47′21″E

- Part of the First Nagorno-Karabakh War
- Location: Khojaly, Nagorno-Karabakh
- Date: 26 February 1992
- Target: Azerbaijani civilians
- Deaths: 200+ (per Human Rights Watch); 485 (per Azerbaijani parliament); 613 (per Azerbaijani government)
- Perpetrators: Armenian forces 366th CIS regiment

The Khojaly massacre (Azerbaijani: Xocalı soyqırımı, Armenian: Խոջալուի արյունահեղություն, romanized: Khojalui aryunaheghut'yun) was the mass killing of Azerbaijani civilians by Armenian forces and the 366th CIS regiment in the town of Khojaly on 26 February 1992. The event became the largest single massacre throughout the entire Nagorno-Karabakh conflict.

Khojaly was an Azerbaijani-populated town of some 6,300 people in the Nagorno-Karabakh Autonomous Oblast of Azerbaijan SSR, also housing the region's only airport in 1992. The town was subject to daily shelling and total blockade by Armenian forces during the First Nagorno-Karabakh War. Without supply of electricity, gas, or water, it was defended by the local forces consisting of about 160 lightly armed men. The Armenian forces, along with some troops of the 366th CIS regiment, launched an offensive in early 1992, forcing almost the entire Azerbaijani population of the enclave to flee, and committing "unconscionable acts of violence against civilians" as they fled.

The massacre was one of the turning points during the First Nagorno-Karabakh War. The death toll given by the Azerbaijani authorities is 613 civilians, including 106 women and 63 children. According to Human Rights Watch, "it is widely accepted" that 200 Azerbaijanis were killed during the massacre, though it notes that as many as 500–1,000 may have died. This number includes combatants and those who died of cold.

== Background ==
In the Nagorno-Karabakh conflict, both Armenians and Azerbaijanis became victims of pogroms and ethnic cleansing, which resulted in numerous casualties and displacement of large groups of people. By 1992, the conflict had escalated into a full-scale war. In February 1992 the capital of Nagorno-Karabakh Autonomous Oblast, Stepanakert, was under a blockade by Azerbaijani forces.

In 1988 the town had 2,135 inhabitants. Due to the First Nagorno-Karabakh War, population exchanges occurred between Armenia and Azerbaijan, and Meskhetian Turk refugees leaving Central Asia subsequently settled in Khojaly. According to Thomas de Waal, Khojaly had been the focus of a large resettlement program by the Azerbaijan government in the late 1980s and early 1990s. This coincided with the First Nagorno-Karabakh War and increased the population to 6200 by 1991.

Khojaly was on the road from Shusha and Stepanakert to Aghdam and had the region's only airport. The airport was of vital importance for the survival of the population in Karabakh, which had no land connection with Armenia and was under a total blockade by Azerbaijan. According to Human Rights Watch, Khojaly was used by Azerbaijani forces as a base for shelling Stepanakert.

In October 1991, the Nagorno-Karabakh forces cut the road connecting Khojaly and Aghdam, so that the only way to reach Khojaly was by helicopter. According to the Memorial civil rights society, from autumn 1991 Khojaly was practically blockaded by Armenian armed forces, and after the withdrawal of the Soviet Internal Troops from Karabakh the blockade became total. Some inhabitants left the blockaded town, but the civilian population was not fully evacuated, despite insistent demands of the head of executive power of Khojaly, Elman Mammadov. Khojaly was defended by local OMON forces under the command of Alif Hajiyev, which numbered about 160 or so lightly armed men. Khojaly was shelled by Armenian forces almost daily in the winter of 1991–1992, and people grew accustomed to spending nights in basements, surviving the total blockade, and the lack of electricity, gas and water.

== Warnings, ultimatum and provision of a humanitarian corridor ==
The report of Memorial stated that the Armenian side claimed that a free corridor was provided for fleeing civilians. The Memorial report says:

According to the officials of the NKR and those taking part in the assault, the Khojaly population was informed about the existence of this 'corridor' through loudspeakers mounted on armoured personnel carriers. NKR officials also noted that, several days prior to the assault, leaflets had been dropped on Khojaly from helicopters, urging the Khojaly population to use the 'free corridor'. However, not a single copy of such a leaflet has been provided to Memorial's observers in support of this assertion. Likewise, no traces of such leaflets have been found by Memorial's observers in Khojaly. When interviewed, Khojaly refugees said that they had not heard about such leaflets. Several days prior to the assault, the representatives of the Armenian side had, on repeated occasions, informed the Khojaly authorities by radio about the upcoming assault and urged them to immediately evacuate the population from the town. The fact that this information had been received by the Azerbaijani side and transferred to Baku is confirmed by Baku newspapers (Bakinskiy Rabochiy)

Armenian fighters stated to HRW investigators that they sent ultimata to the Azerbaijani forces in Khojaly warning that unless missile attacks from that town on Stepanakert ceased, Armenian forces would attack. The report quotes the testimony of an Azerbaijani woman who states that after Armenians seized Malybeyli, an ultimatum was made to Alif Gajiev, the head of the militia in Khojaly, who told the population on 15 February, but they didn't consider leaving the town. The report also noted that by remaining armed and in-uniform, the Azerbaijani militia endangered the retreating civilians.

Salman Abasov, one of the survivors of massacre stated:

Several days before the tragedy the Armenians told us several times over the radio that they would capture the town and demanded that we leave it. For a longtime helicopters flew into Khojali and it wasn't clear if anyone thought about our fate, took an interest in us. We received practically no help. Moreover, when it was possible to take our women, children out of the town, we were persuaded not to do so.

Azerbaijani filmmaker Ramiz Fataliev testified in his interview that the Azerbaijani authorities did not evacuate the civilians from Khojaly because they thought that by doing so they would invite the Armenians to occupy Khojaly:

On the 22nd of February, in the president's, prime-minister's, KGB minister's and others' presence, the meeting of the National Security Council was held… At the meeting, a resolution was made not to evacuate the people from Khojaly. It was considered that if we evacuated the population, we would invite Armenians to occupy the settlement. That is, we would ourselves incite Armenians to attack. Even the members of the Security Council didn't believe that Armenians could commit this sort of actions that resulted in genocide. They thought that if the population left the settlement we ourselves would give Khojaly up.

Elmar Mammadov, the Mayor of Khojaly testified that the Azerbaijani authorities knew about the attack but they took no measure to evacuate the civilians:

On 25 February 1992 at 8:30 pm we were told that the tanks of the enemy have been placed around the city in a fighting position. We informed everybody about this over the radio. Furthermore, on 24 February I called Aghdam and told them, that a captured Armenian fighter has informed us on the impending attack... There was no response. I have also asked to send a helicopter for the transportation of the elderly, women and children. But no help came.

None of the witnesses interviewed by Helsinki Watch on the Azerbaijani side said that they knew beforehand of such a corridor.

== Assault ==
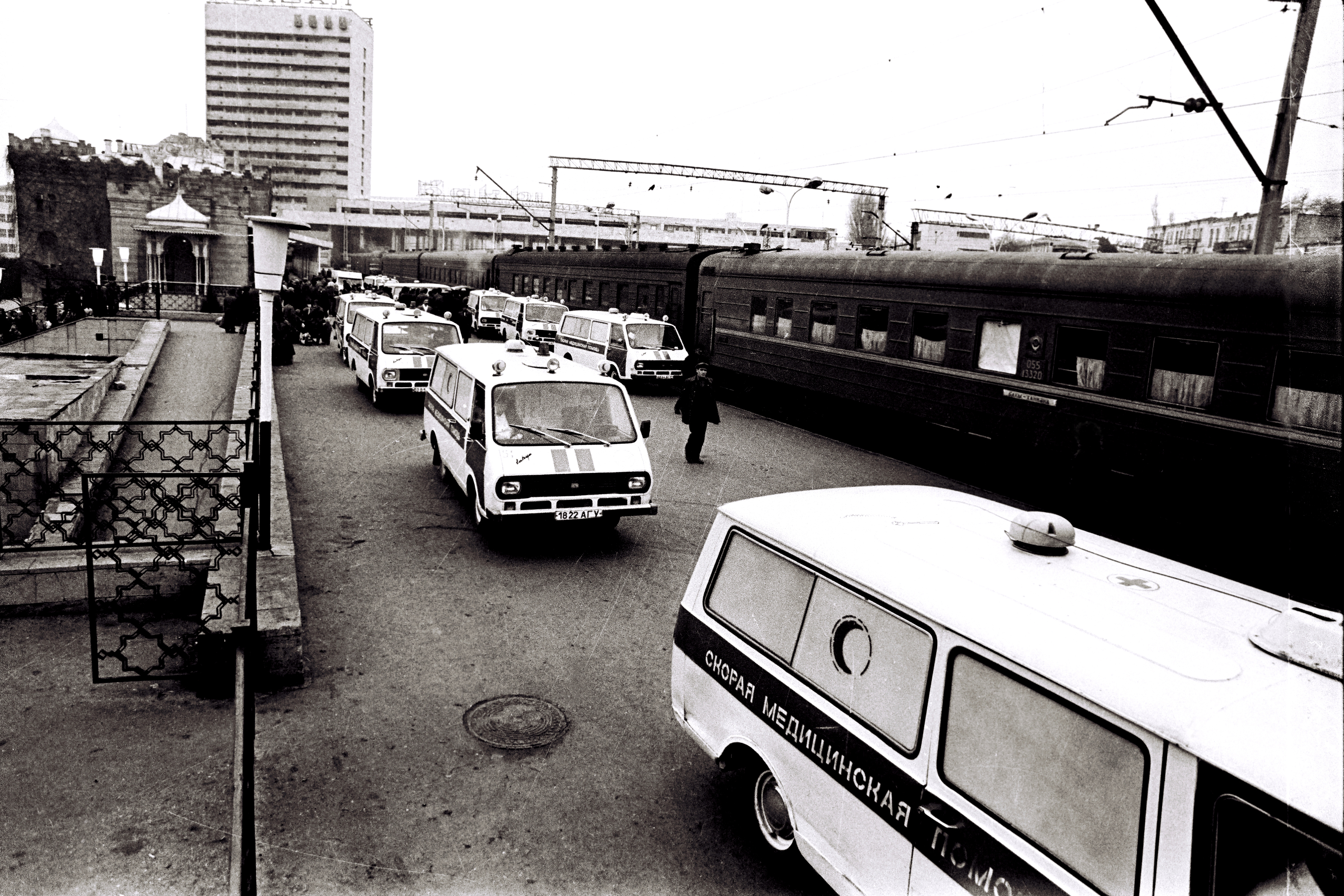
Ambulance cars in Baku carrying bodies of Azerbaijanis killed in Khojaly

On 25–26 February 1992, Armenian forces went on the offensive, forcing almost the entire Azerbaijani population of the enclave to flee, and committing what HRW describes as "unconscionable acts of violence against civilians" as they fled. According to HRW, the tragedy struck when "a large column of residents, accompanied by a few dozen retreating fighters, fled the city as it fell to Armenian forces. It is reported that as they approached the border with Azerbaijan, they came across an Armenian military post and were cruelly fired upon".

According to Memorial society, part of the population started leaving Khojaly soon after the assault began, trying to flee towards Agdam, and armed people from the town's garrison were among some of the fleeing groups. People left in two directions: 1) from the east side of the town northeastwards along the river, passing Askeran to their left (this route, according to Armenian officials, was provided as a "free corridor"); and 2) from the north side of the town northeastwards, passing Askeran to their right (it appears that fewer refugees fled using this route). Thus, the majority of civilians left Khojaly, while around 200–300 people stayed in the town, hiding in their houses and basements. As a result of the shelling of the town, an unascertained number of civilians were killed in Khojaly during the assault. The Armenian side practically refused to tell Memorial observers how many people perished. The refugees in both groups were fired upon, resulting in death of many of them. Those who remained alive dispersed. Running refugees came across Armenian military posts and were fired upon. Some refugees managed to escape to Agdam, while some, mainly women and children (the exact number is impossible to determine), froze to death while wandering around in mountains, some were captured near the villages of Nakhichevanik and Pirjamal.

Helsinki Watch reported that "the militia, still in uniform, and some still carrying their guns, were interspersed with the masses of civilians" and according to eyewitness accounts, there was a shooting between Armenian forces and the Azerbaijani forces who were mixed with the civilians. At the same time, Human Rights Watch and Memorial stated that the killing of civilians could not be justified under any circumstances. Human Rights Watch noted that

"The attacking party is still obliged to take precautionary measures to avoid or minimize civilian casualties. In particular, the party must suspend an attack if it becomes apparent that the attack may be expected to cause civilian casualties that are excessive in relation to the concrete and direct military advantage anticipated. The circumstances surrounding the attack at Nakhichevanik on those fleeing from Khojaly indicate that Armenian forces and the troops of the 366th CIS regiment (who were not apparently acting on orders from their commanders) deliberately disregarded this customary law restraint on attacks".

However, the obligation to protect the civilians was likewise breached by the Azerbaijani side. As stated by HRW report:

The parties may not use civilians to shield military targets from attack or to shield military operations including retreats. Thus a party that intersperses combatants with fleeing civilians puts those civilians at risk and violates its obligation to protect its own civilians.

=== Death toll ===
The death toll of the massacre is unknown. Initial reports by Western journalists who reached the scene described seeing "dozens of bodies", with a Reuters photographer documenting 70 bodies in the scene of the massacre.

Human Rights Watch described the Khojaly massacre in their 1994 report as "the largest massacre to date" in the Nagorno-Karabakh conflict. Mentioning that "there are no exact figures for the number of Azeri civilians killed because Karabakh Armenian forces gained control of the area after the massacre", HRW estimated the number of Azerbaijani civilian deaths at least 161 in 1993 and then to 200 in 1994, mentioning the possibility that as many as 500–1,000 may have died".

The death toll given by Azerbaijani authorities was 613 civilians, including 106 women and 63 children. By 28 March 1992, over 700 civilians from Khojaly, mostly women and children detained both in the city and on their way to Aghdam, were delivered to the Azerbaijani side, according to Moscow-based Memorial society. Memorial described the actions of Armenian militants as in gross violation of a number of basic international human rights conventions.

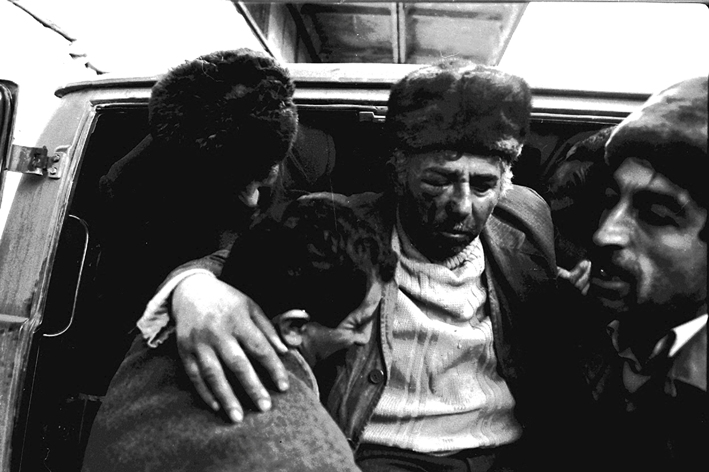
A survivor of the Khojaly massacre

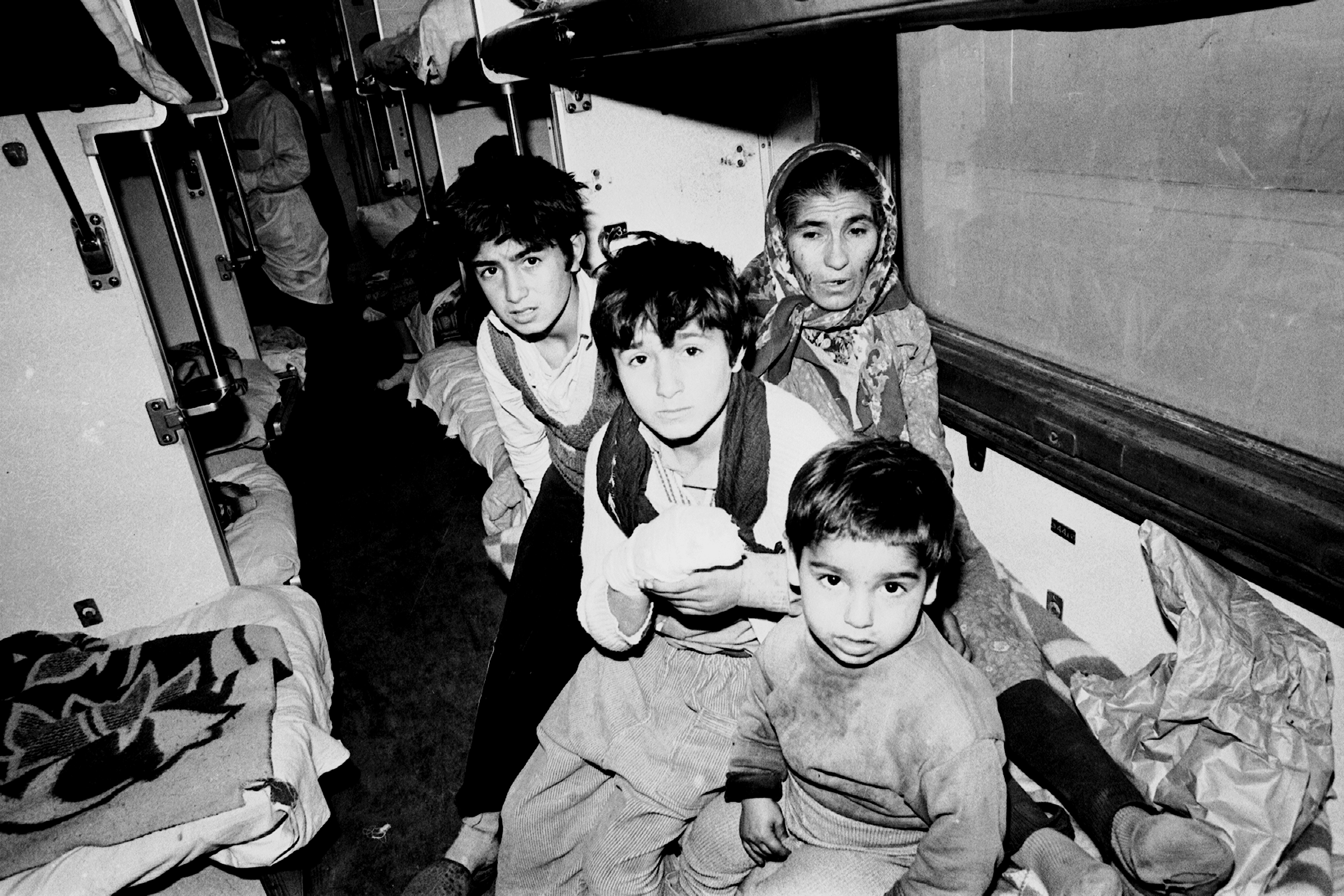
Azerbaijani refugees after the Khojaly massacre in train

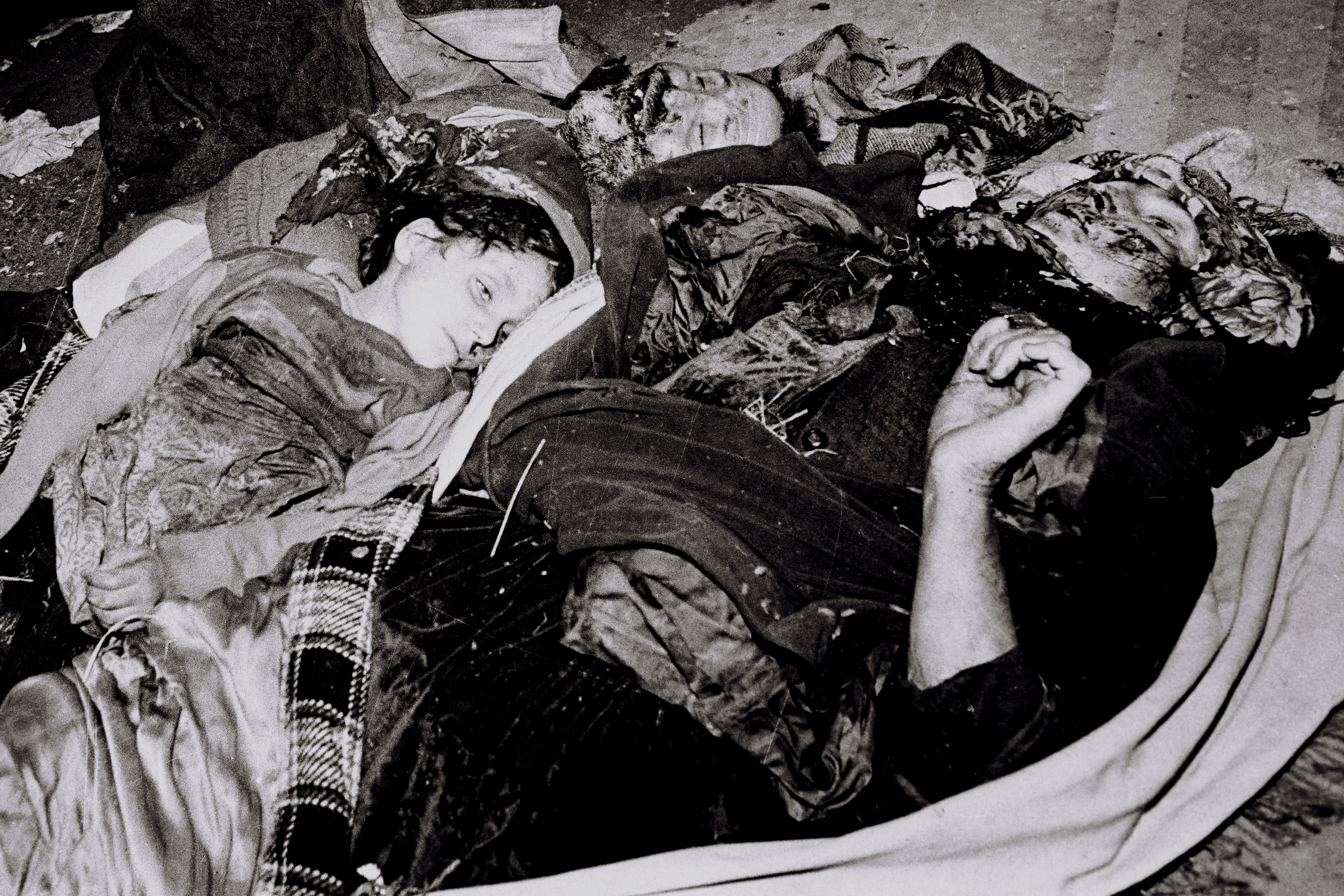
Victims of the massacre

== Reports and analyses ==
Anatol Lieven wrote in The Times after visiting the site of the massacre: "Scattered amid the withered grass and bushes along a small valley and across the hillside beyond are the bodies of last Wednesday's massacre by Armenian forces of Azerbaijani refugees. ... Of the 31 we saw, only one policeman and two apparent national volunteers were wearing a uniform. All the rest were civilians, including eight women and three small children. Two groups, apparently families, had fallen together, the children cradled in the women's arms. Several of them, including one small girl, had terrible head injuries: only her face was left. Survivors have told how they saw Armenians shooting them point blank as they lay on the ground."

Helen Womack reported in The Independent: "The exact number of victims is still unclear, but there can be little doubt that Azeri civilians were massacred by Armenian fighters in the snowy mountains of Nagorny Karabakh last week. Refugees from the enclave town of Khojaly, sheltering in the Azeri border town of Agdam, give largely consistent accounts of how their enemies attacked their homes on the night of 25 February, chased those who fled and shot them in the surrounding forests. Yesterday I saw 75 freshly dug graves in one cemetery in addition to four mutilated corpses we were shown in the mosque when we arrived in Agdam late on Tuesday. I also saw women and children with bullet wounds, in a makeshift hospital in a string of railway carriages at the station", "I have little doubt that on this occasion, two weeks ago, the Azeris were the victims of Armenian brutality. In the past, it has been the other way round"

Russian journalist Victoria Ivleva entered Khojaly after it fell to Armenian armed forces. She took photos of the town streets strewn with dead bodies of its inhabitants, including women and children. She described how she saw a large crowd of Meskhetian Turks from Khojaly who were led to captivity by the Armenian militants and she was hit by an Armenian soldier who took her for one of the captives, when she was helping a woman falling behind the crowd with four children, one of which wounded, and the other one newly born. The captives were later exchanged or released, and in 2011 Ivleva found that woman in Azerbaijan. Her little child grew up, but did not speak, this was attributed to the shock she suffered in childhood.

After the seizure of Khojaly, Armenians allowed Azerbaijanis to claim their dead, based on which the Azerbaijanis later grounded their accusations of the massacre. As argued by British historian Christopher J. Walker, the group committing a massacre would have hardly taken up any of these measures.

=== Video footage and photographs ===
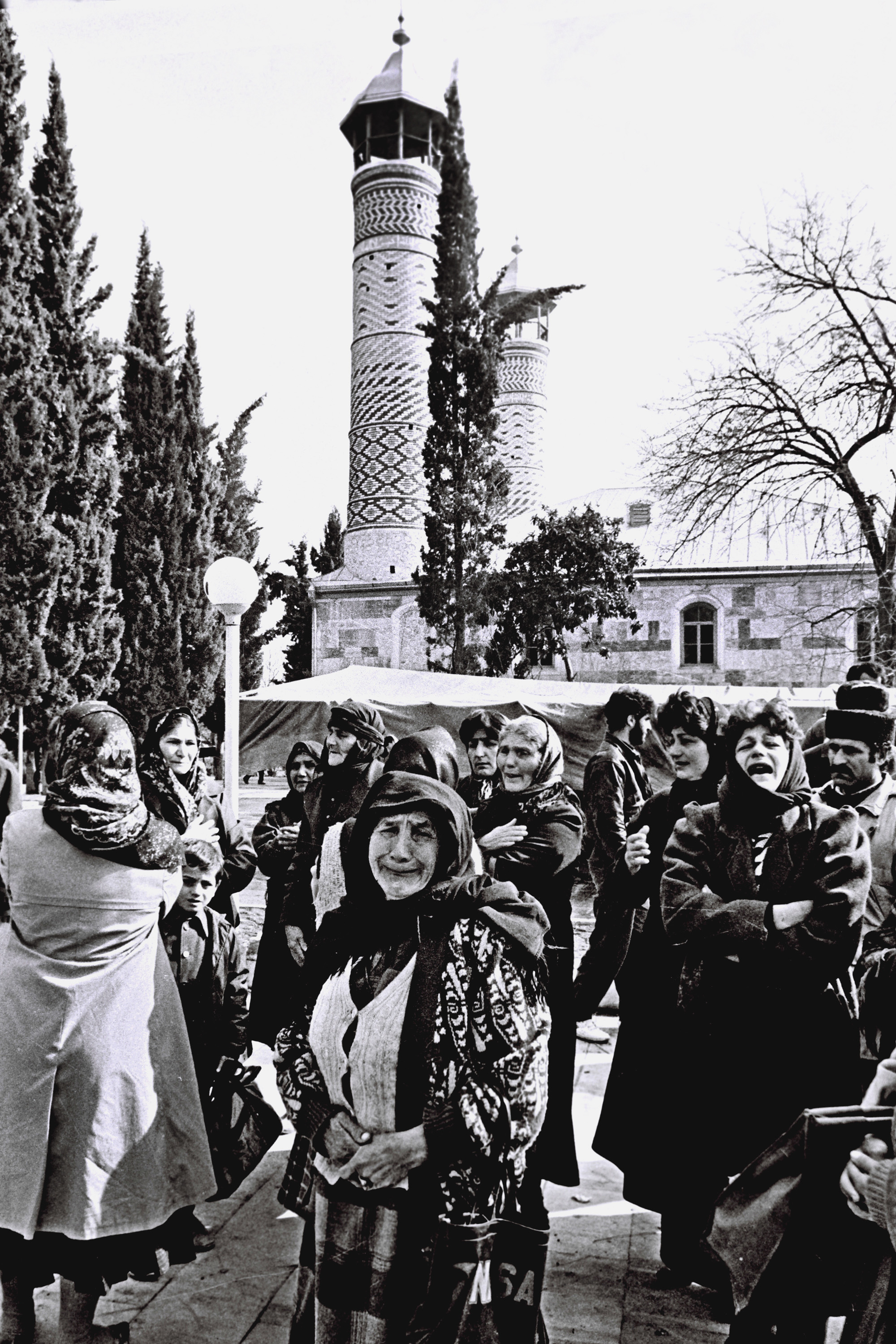
Azerbaijanis who managed to escape the massacre taking refuge in the Agdam Mosque

The site of the Khojaly mass killing was filmed on videotape by Azerbaijani journalist Chingiz Mustafayev, who was accompanied by the Russian journalist Yuri Romanov in the first helicopter flight to the scene of the tragedy. Romanov described in his memoir how he looked out of the window of the helicopter and jumped back from an incredibly horrible view. The whole area up to the horizon was covered with dead bodies of women, elderly people and boys and girls of all ages, from newly born to teenagers. Amid the mass of bodies two caught his sight. An old woman with uncovered grey head was lying face down next to a little girl in a blue jacket. Their legs were tied with barbed wire, and the old woman's hands were tied as well. Both were shot in their heads, and the little girl in her last move was stretching out her hands to her dead grandmother. Shocked, Romanov initially forgot about his camera, but started filming after recovering from the shock. However, the helicopter came under the fire, and they had to leave.

==== Dana Mazalová ====
Czech journalist Dana Mazalová said that in Baku she had seen Chingiz Mustafayev's unedited footage of the dead bodies without the signs of mutilation that were shown in later footage.

Mazalová, who recalled Mustafayev told her about the massacre, claimed that Azeri forces committed a massacre of Meskhetian Turks and placed the bodies there to disrupt a Commission on Security and Cooperation in Europe meeting for the conflict a month later.

=== Ayaz Mutalibov ===
Former Azerbaijani President Ayaz Mutalibov repeatedly linked the Khojaly massacre to the militia of Abulfaz Elchibey's Popular Front, claiming that it was done in an attempt to oust him from power. He repeated this claim to Mazalová.

=== Eynulla Fatullayev and "Karabakh Diary" ===
Azerbaijani journalist Eynulla Fatullayev traveled in 2005 to Armenia and Nagorno-Karabakh and wrote an article called "Karabakh Diary". He claimed that he met some refugees from Khojaly, temporarily settled in Naftalan, who said that the Armenians had indeed left a free corridor and the Armenian soldiers positioned behind the corridor had not opened fire on them. Some soldiers from the battalions of the National Front of Azerbaijan instead, for some reason, had led part of the refugees in the direction of the village of Nakhichevanik, which during that period had been under the control of the Armenians' Askeran battalion. The other group of refugees were hit by artillery volleys while they were reaching the Agdam Region.

However, in his statement to the European Court of Human Rights Fatullayev claimed that in the article "The Karabakh Diary", he had merely conveyed the statements of a local Armenian, who had told Fatullayev his version of the events during the interview. Fatullayev claimed that his article did not directly accuse any Azerbaijani national of committing any crime and that in his article, there was no statement asserting that any of the Khojaly victims had been killed or mutilated by Azerbaijani fighters.

Fatullayev was sued for defamation and convicted in an Azerbaijani court to eight and a half years in prison and a penalty fee of $230,000. Reporters without Borders strongly condemned this decision, stating that the judgment was based on no evidence but is purely political. The European Court of Human Rights ruled that Fatullayev must be released, because in their opinion "although "The Karabakh Diary" might have contained certain exaggerated or provocative assertions, the author did not cross the limits of journalistic freedom". The Court, however, also noted that "The Karabakh Diary" did not constitute a piece of investigative journalism focusing specifically on the Khojaly events and considered that Fatullayev's statements about these events were made rather in passing, parallel to the main theme of the article.

=== The 366th CIS regiment's role ===
According to international observers, soldiers and officers of the 366th Guards Motor Rifle Regiment of United Armed Forces of the Commonwealth of Independent States took part in the attack on Khojaly. Memorial called for an investigation of the facts of participation of CIS soldiers in the military operations in the region and transfer of military equipment to the sides of the conflict. Soon after the massacre, in early March 1992, the regiment was withdrawn from Nagorno-Karabakh. Paratroopers evacuated the personnel of the regiment by helicopter, but over 100 soldiers and officers remained in Stepanakert and joined the Armenian forces, including the commander of the 2nd battalion major Seyran Ohanyan, who later served as a Minister of Defense of Armenia. The Krasnaya Zvezda newspaper reported:

Despite categorical orders of the command of the military district, some military personnel of the 366th regiment took part in military operations near Khojaly on Karabakhi side on the 20s of February. At least two such instances were recorded. And during evacuation of the military personnel of the regiment paratroopers selectively searched several servicemen and found large amounts of money on them, including foreign currency.

== Armenian reactions ==
The Armenian side officially asserts that the killings occurred as a result of wartime military operations, and were caused by the prevention of the town inhabitants' evacuation by Azerbaijani forces, who shot those attempting to flee. This explanation, however, is widely disputed. Among others, the executive director of Human Rights Watch has stated that: "we place direct responsibility for the civilian deaths with Karabakh Armenian forces. Indeed, neither our report nor that of Memorial includes any evidence to support the argument that Azerbaijani forces obstructed the flight of, or fired on Azeri civilians". British journalist Thomas de Waal noted that "the overwhelming evidence of what happened has not stopped some Armenians, in distasteful fashion, trying to muddy the waters". However, De Waal has also stated that the tragedy in Khojaly was a result of a chaotic situation, and not a "deliberately planned" action by the Armenians.

At the same time, some Armenian sources admitted the responsibility of the Armenian side. According to Markar Melkonian, the brother of the Armenian military leader Monte Melkonian, "Khojaly had been a strategic goal, but it had also been an act of revenge." The date of the massacre in Khojaly had a special significance: it was the run-up to the fourth anniversary of the anti-Armenian pogrom in the city of Sumgait where the civilian Armenian population was brutally murdered solely because of their ethnic origin. Melkonian wrote that fighters of Arabo and Aramo military detachments stabbed many Azeri civilians to death, despite Monte Melkonian strictly ordering not to harm captives.

In an interview with Thomas de Waal, Serzh Sargsyan, the then Defense Minister of Armenia who later became president of Armenia, he stated that Stepanakert was being shelled from Khojali, that the fleeing Azerbaijanis had put up armed resistance, that "a lot was exaggerated" in the casualties and that Azerbaijanis needed something to compare to the Sumgait pogrom. At the same time, he stated:

Before Khojali, the Azerbaijanis thought that they were joking with us, they thought that the Armenians were people who could not raise their hand against the civilian population. We were able to break that [stereotype]. And that's what happened. And we should also take into account that amongst those boys were people who had fled from Baku and Sumgait. Although I think that is still very much exaggerated, very much. Azerbaijanis needed an excuse to equate a place to Sumgait, but they can not be compared. Yes, in fact, was in Khojaly civilians, but along with the civilians were soldiers. [W]hen a shell is flying through the air, it doesn't distinguish between a civilian resident and a soldier; it doesn't have eyes. If the civilian population stays there, even though there was a perfect opportunity to leave, that means that they also are taking part in military operations . . . The corridor was not left open in order to shoot them, shooting could have been done in Khojali, not somewhere near Agdam. .

According to Memorial society,

Official representatives of the NKR and members of the Armenian armed forces explained the death of civilians in the zone of the 'free corridor' by the fact that there were armed people fleeing together with the refugees, who were firing at Armenian outposts, thus drawing return fire, as well as by an attempted breakthrough by the main Azerbaijani forces. According to members of the Armenian armed forces, the Azerbaijani forces attempted to battle through Agdam in the direction of the 'free corridor'. At the moment when the Armenian outposts were fighting off this attack, the first groups of Khojaly refugees approached them from the rear. The armed people who were among the refugees began firing at the Armenian outposts. During the battle, one outpost was destroyed, but the fighters from another outpost, of whose existence the Azerbaijanis were unaware, opened fire from a close distance at the people coming from Khojaly. According to testimonies of Khojaly refugees (including those published in the press), the armed people inside the refugee column did exchange gunfire with Armenian outposts, but on each occasion, the fire was opened first from the Armenian side.

Denial of the Khojaly massacre, by either claiming that the massacre was committed by Azerbaijanis themselves or that no civilian was killed is common among the Armenian public, officials and organisations. According to Rachel Avraham, senior media research analyst at the Israeli Center for Near East Policy Research, Armenia's non-recognition of the Khojaly massacre was an "impediment for peace" in the region, and that the "same state that perpetrated that crime against humanity" is continuing to not take responsibility for their actions. To date, no one has been prosecuted for the massacre in Khojaly.

In November 2019, Armenian Prime Minister Nikol Pashinyan called the massacre "a blatant lie," claiming that it was "carried out by Azerbaijanis themselves", despite the findings by Human Rights Watch which placed direct responsibility for the civilian deaths with Karabakh Armenian forces.

Pashinyan referred to Ayaz Mutalibov's interview to claim that the massacre had been committed not by Armenian soldiers but by Popular Front of Azerbaijan militants who allegedly shot their own civilians escaping through the corridor. Nevertheless, attempting to minimize his own role did not help him. In one of his interviews Mutalibov stated that the event was "organized" by his political opponents to force his resignation. The interview was much cited in Armenia.

As the survivors of Khojaly say, all this was organized to create a cause for my resignation. A certain power was working for discrediting the President. I don't think the Armenians, who are very accurate and who know very well how to behave in such situations, would have allowed the Azerbaijanis to obtain evidence from Khojaly, which would expose them in committing fascist acts… I assume that someone had a vested interest in showing these photos in the session of the Supreme Council and placing all the blame on me… However, the general background of arguments is, that a corridor by which the people could leave, was, nevertheless, left by Armenians. Why then would they begin to shoot?"

In later interviews, however, Mutalibov would condemn the Armenians, claiming that they blatantly misinterpreted his words. He also denied ever accusing the Popular Front of Azerbaijan of having anything to do with these events, saying that he only meant that the PFA took advantage of the situation to focus the popular resentment on him. Mutalibov stated that after the massacre he called the speaker of the Supreme Soviet of NKAO Artur Mkrtchyan, and the latter assured him that the people of Khojaly were given a corridor to escape, and he only referred to Mkrtchyan's words, without making any assertions as to whether the corridor actually existed.

Armenian organisations such as Armenian National Committee of America, Political Science Association of Armenia and Armenian National Committee of Australia have embraced the denialism of the massacre by calling it "propaganda" and "fabricated".

== Legacy ==
=== Memorials ===
Memorials have been erected in Azerbaijan and abroad to commemorate the Khojaly massacre.

=== In popular culture ===
==== Footage ====
The footage of Chingiz Mustafayev increased the awareness of the campaign. In 2010, it was broadcast by American television channel CNN.

==== In sport ====
On 11 May 2014, Arda Turan of Atlético Madrid, sponsored by Azerbaijan, commemorated the Khojaly massacre. The footballer explained by wanting to raise awareness about this issue and promoting world peace. The sponsorship by Azerbaijan has been condemned by Reporters Without Borders. Atlético Madrid admitted its sponsorship deal with Azerbaijan has a political dimension, saying the intention is to "promote the image of Azerbaijan".

== Nomenclature, accusations of "genocide" and politicization ==
Most governments and media use the term massacre to refer to the incident. Azerbaijani sources oftentimes refer to the massacre as a tragedy (Azerbaijani: Xocalı faciəsi) or a genocide (Xocalı soyqırımı).

Commemorations of the Khojaly massacre in Turkey and Azerbaijan are used to counter the narrative of the Armenian genocide. Speeches during the commemoration ceremonies in Turkey have an intense anti-Armenian coloring. Their messages boil down to claiming that since Armenians committed the massacre, it is them who are "perpetrators", Turks are "victims", and the Armenian Genocide is a lie.

According to academics Hans Gutbrod and David Wood:

The Azerbaijani government, under the auspices of the country's ruling family, made concerted and well-funded efforts to establish Khojaly as a genocide, including through a social media campaign. Even at a stretch, this massacre, horrendous and representative of subsequent wider displacement of Azerbaijanis as it was, does not meet the criteria for a genocide. Azerbaijani authorities claim a death toll that is higher than that evaluated as likely by Human Rights Watch. For many experts on the region, Khojaly is now more evocative of an encounter with a kleptocratic regime rather than the memory of the Azerbaijani civilians who lost their lives on that winter night.

In the opinion of journalist Aykan Sever, the instrumentalization of the Khojaly massacre for creating a victim image for Turks intensified following the assassination of ethnic Armenian journalist Hrant Dink in January 2007 in Istanbul.

British journalist Thomas de Waal thinks that the massacre's commemoration as a purported "genocide" not only depicts Azerbaijan as a "victim of aggression", but also has become the countering and "competing" idea against the extermination of Armenians.

Historian and genocide scholar Yair Auron calls the use of the term "genocide" for the events in Khojaly a "cynical Azeri fabrication" fostered by Azerbaijan. According to Auron, the use of the term "genocide" for the Khojaly massacre desecrates the memory of the Holocaust. Auron also criticized Israel for "supporting this Azerbaijani claim directly and indirectly". He further stated that "there are several versions regarding what happened in the Armenian enclave, including a disputed numbers of victims. There are some who claim there was not even a massacre, but one thing is clear: No genocide took place there. I say this as a genocide researcher and as a person who believes that the murder of even one person because of his affiliation is an intolerable crime." The Lemkin Institute for Genocide Prevention wrote "there has never been an independent fact-finding mission allowed into the area and no independent scholars can verify the facts and arguments offered by Azerbaijani state authorities and state-supported researchers."

=== Commemoration ===
==== U.S. states ====
Map of USA states that commemorated the victims of the Khojaly massacre

- US State of Massachusetts commemorated the Khojaly Massacre in 2010.
- US State of Texas commemorated the Khojaly Massacre in 2011.
- US State of New Jersey commemorated the Khojaly Massacre in 2012.
- (Georgia (U.S. state)) US State of Georgia commemorated the Khojaly Massacre on 28 March 2012.
- US State of Maine commemorated the Khojaly Massacre on 23 March 2012.
- US State of New Mexico commemorated the Khojaly Massacre on 28 January 2013.
- US State of Arkansas commemorated the Khojaly Massacre on 8 February 2013.
- US State of Mississippi commemorated the Khojaly Massacre on 25 February 2013.
- US State of Oklahoma commemorated the Khojaly Massacre on 4 March 2013.
- US State of Tennessee commemorated the Khojaly Massacre on 18 March 2013.
- US State of Pennsylvania commemorated the Khojaly Massacre on 18 March 2013.
- US State of West Virginia commemorated the Khojaly Massacre on 3 April 2013.
- US State of Connecticut commemorated the Khojaly Massacre on 3 April 2013.
- US State of Florida commemorated the Khojaly Massacre on 3 April 2013.
- US State of Indiana commemorated the Khojaly Massacre on 3 March 2014.
- US State of Utah commemorated the Khojaly Massacre on March 2, 2015.
- US State of Nebraska commemorated the Khojaly Massacre on February 11, 2016.
- US State of Hawaii commemorated the Khojaly Massacre on February 15, 2016.
- US State of Montana commemorated the Khojaly Massacre on 18 February 2016.
- US State of Arizona commemorated the Khojaly Massacre on 24 February 2016.
- US state of Kentucky commemorated the Khojaly Massacre on 25 February 2016
- US State of Idaho commemorated the Khojaly Massacre on 26 February 2016.
- US State of Nevada commemorated the Khojaly Massacre on 28 February 2017.
- US State of Ohio commemorated the Khojaly Massacre on 26 February 2020.
- US State of Minnesota commemorated the Khojaly Massacre on 15 February 2021.
- US State of Illinois commemorated the Khojaly Massacre on 18 February 2021.
- US State of Alabama commemorated the Khojaly Massacre on 25 February 2021.
- US State of Virginia commemorated the Khojaly Massacre on 27 February 2021.

== See also ==
- Maraga massacre
