= Patara, Nagorno-Karabakh =

Patara / Badara Պատարա / Բադարա
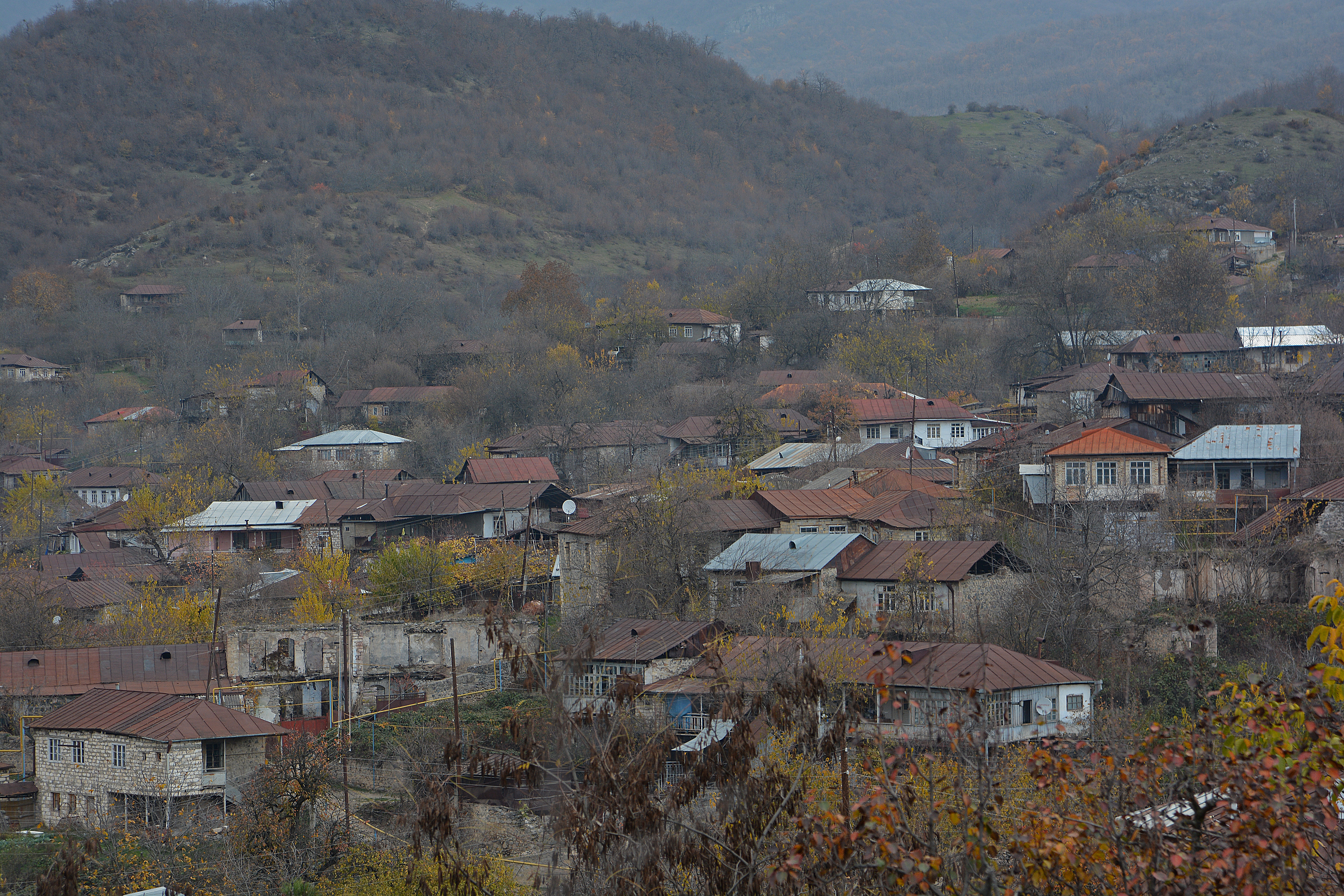

- Location within Azerbaijan Location within Karabakh Economic Region
- Coordinates: 39°55′18″N 46°39′43″E
- Country: Azerbaijan
  - District: Khojaly
- Elevation: 890 m (2,920 ft)

Population (2015)
  - Total: 815
- Time zone: UTC+4 (AZT)

Patara (Armenian: Պատարա) or Badara (Armenian: Բադարա) is a village in the Khojaly District of Azerbaijan, in the region of Nagorno-Karabakh. Until 2023 it was controlled by the breakaway Republic of Artsakh. The village had an ethnic Armenian-majority population until the expulsion of the Armenian population of Nagorno-Karabakh by Azerbaijan following the 2023 Azerbaijani offensive in Nagorno-Karabakh.

== Toponymy ==
The village was historically known as Ptretsik (Armenian: Պտրեցիկ).

== History ==
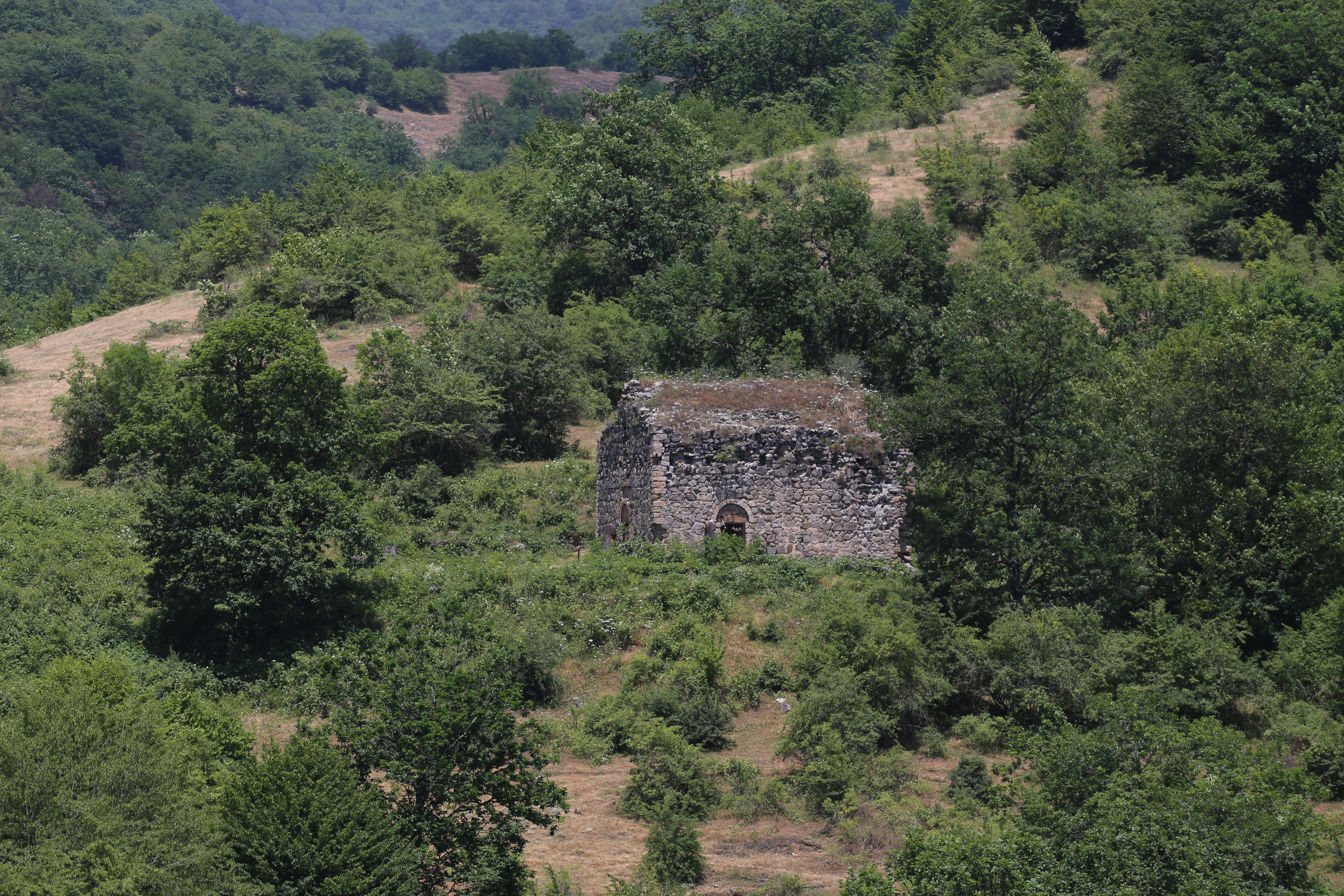
13th-century Holy Savior Church

During the Soviet period, the village was a part of the Askeran District of the Nagorno-Karabakh Autonomous Oblast.

After the 2020 Nagorno-Karabakh war, Artsakh launched the construction of a new settlement for IDPs in the area between Patara and the neighboring village of Astghashen, for people displaced from the villages of Sghnakh, Jraghatsner, Madatashen and Moshkhmhat in the Askeran Province. The village was heavily bombarded during the Second Nagorno-Karabakh War, and much of its territory is littered with unexploded ammunition.

== Historical heritage sites ==
Historical heritage sites in and around the village include the small chapel of Drbasut Yeghtsi (Armenian: Դրբասուտ Եղցի), a cemetery from between the 9th and 13th centuries, a village, cemetery, and khachkar from between the 10th and 13th centuries, a 12th/13th-century fortress, the church of Tsera Nahatak (Armenian: Ծերա Նահատակ) built in 1326, the 12th/13th-century monastery of Okhty Yeghtsi (Armenian: Օխտը Եղցի), the 12th/13th-century monastery of Otskavank (Armenian: Օծկավանք), the 13th-century church of Surb Amenaprkich (Armenian: Սուրբ Ամենափրկիչ, lit. 'Holy Savior'), the restored three-nave St. Stephen's Church (Armenian: Սուրբ Ստեփանոս եկեղեցի, romanized: Surb Stepanos Yekeghetsi) built in 1870, and a 19th-century watermill.

== Economy and culture ==
The population is mainly engaged in agriculture and animal husbandry. As of 2015, the village has a municipal building, a secondary school, a house of culture, two shops, and a medical centre.

== Demographics ==
The village had 849 inhabitants in 2005, and 815 inhabitants in 2015.

As of January 2026, 73 Azerbaijani families, totaling 286 individuals, have been resettled in the Badara village by Azerbaijan.

== Gallery ==
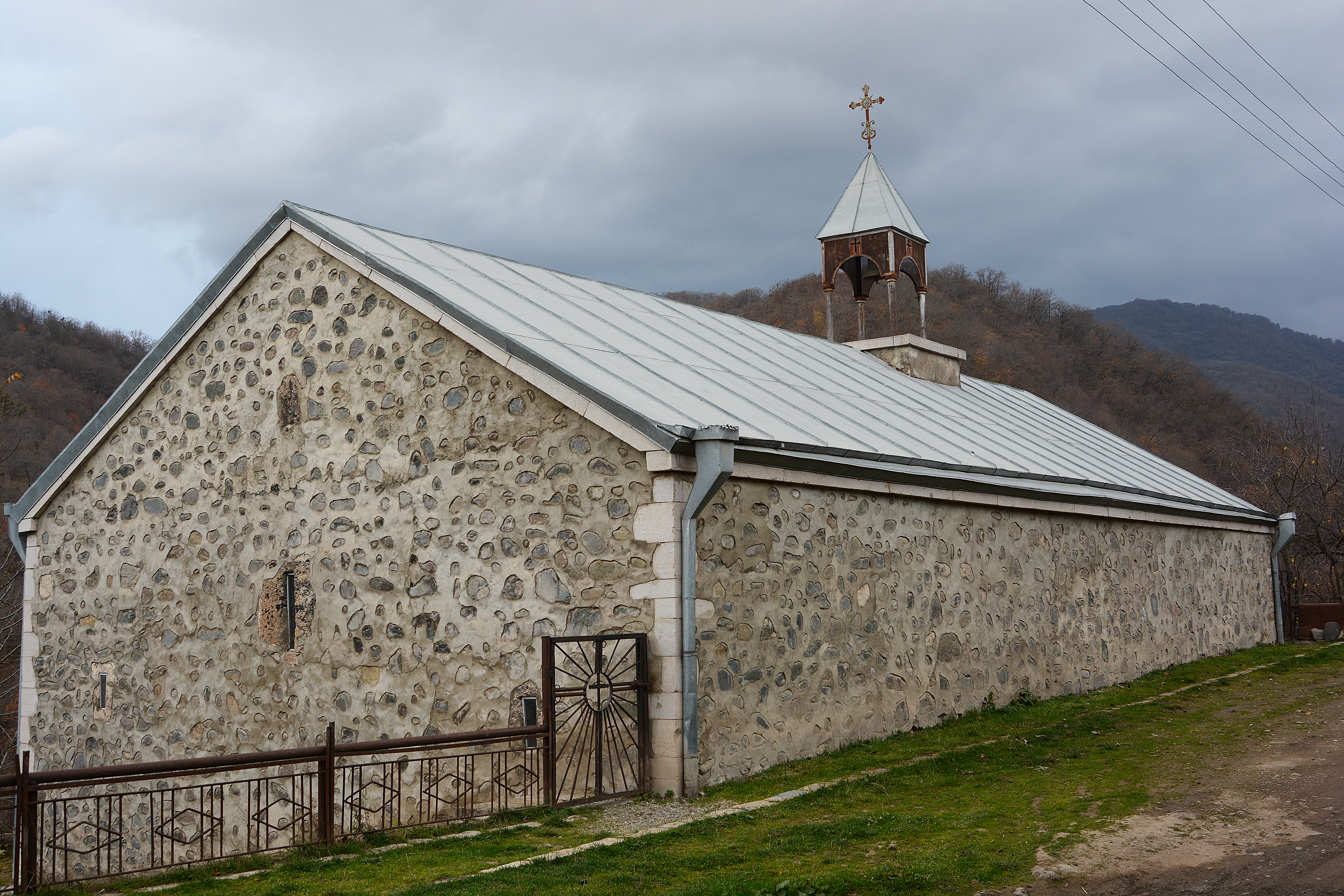
St. Stephen's Church, built in 1870

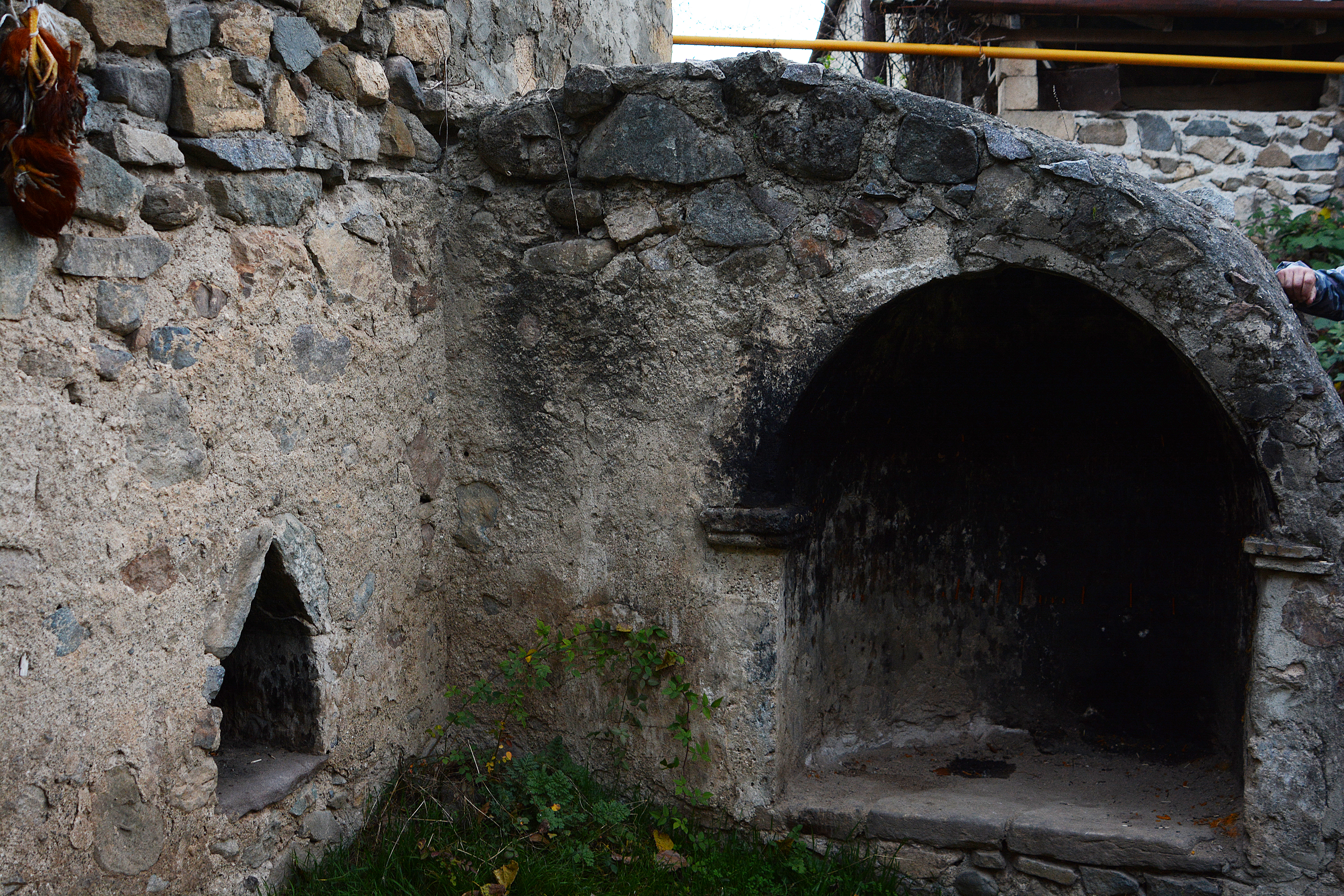
Religious shrine

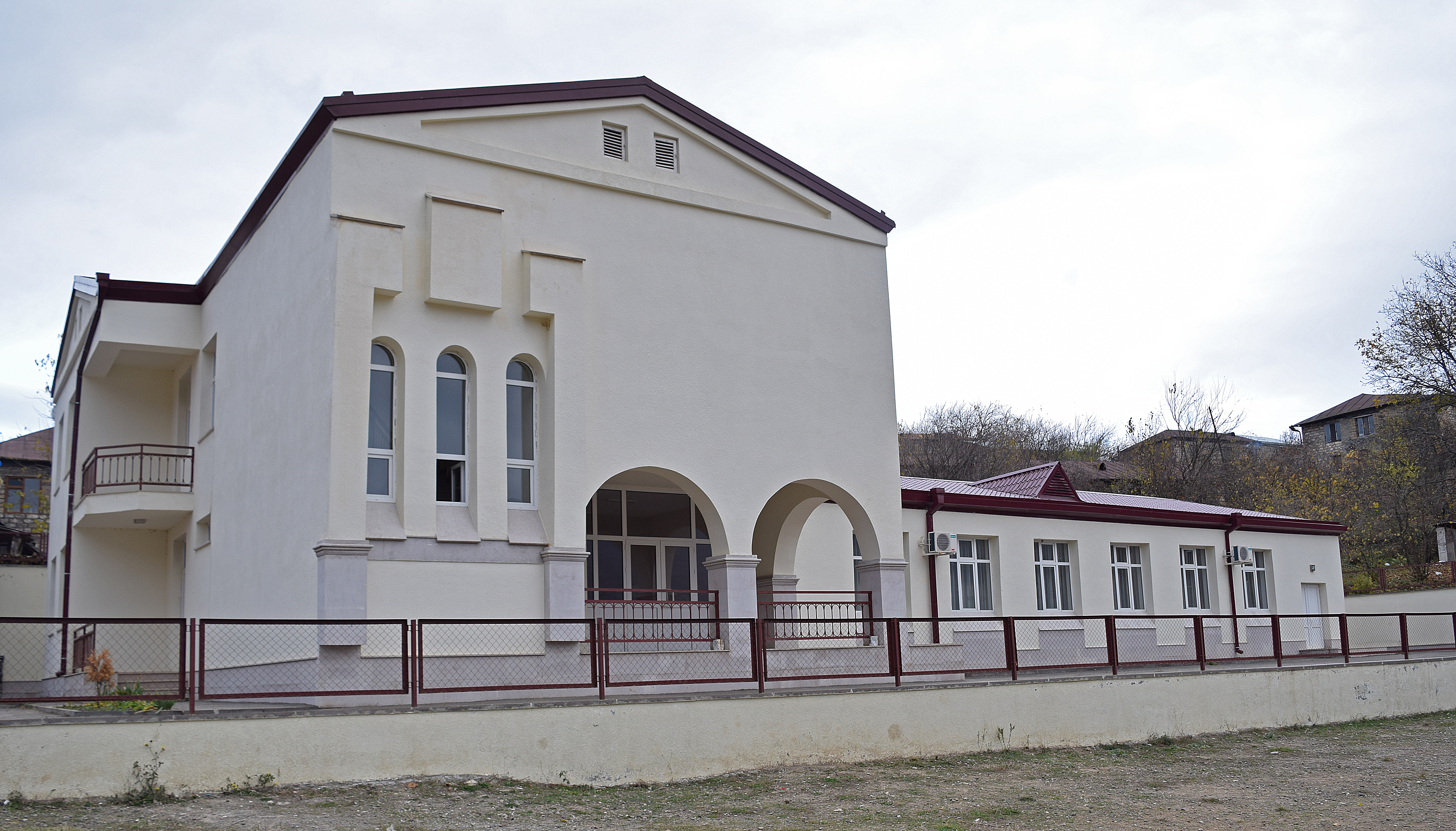
Municipal building

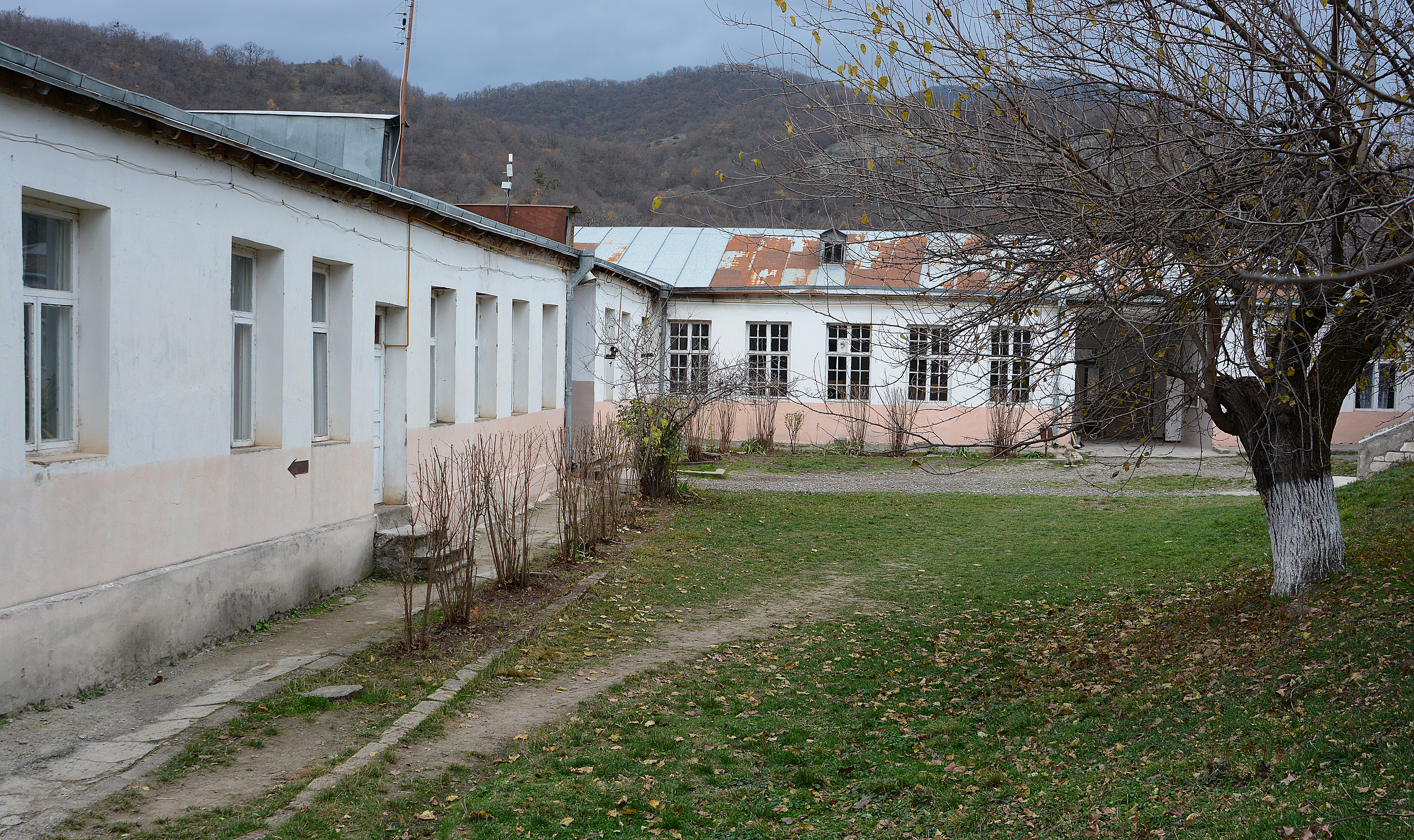
Village school

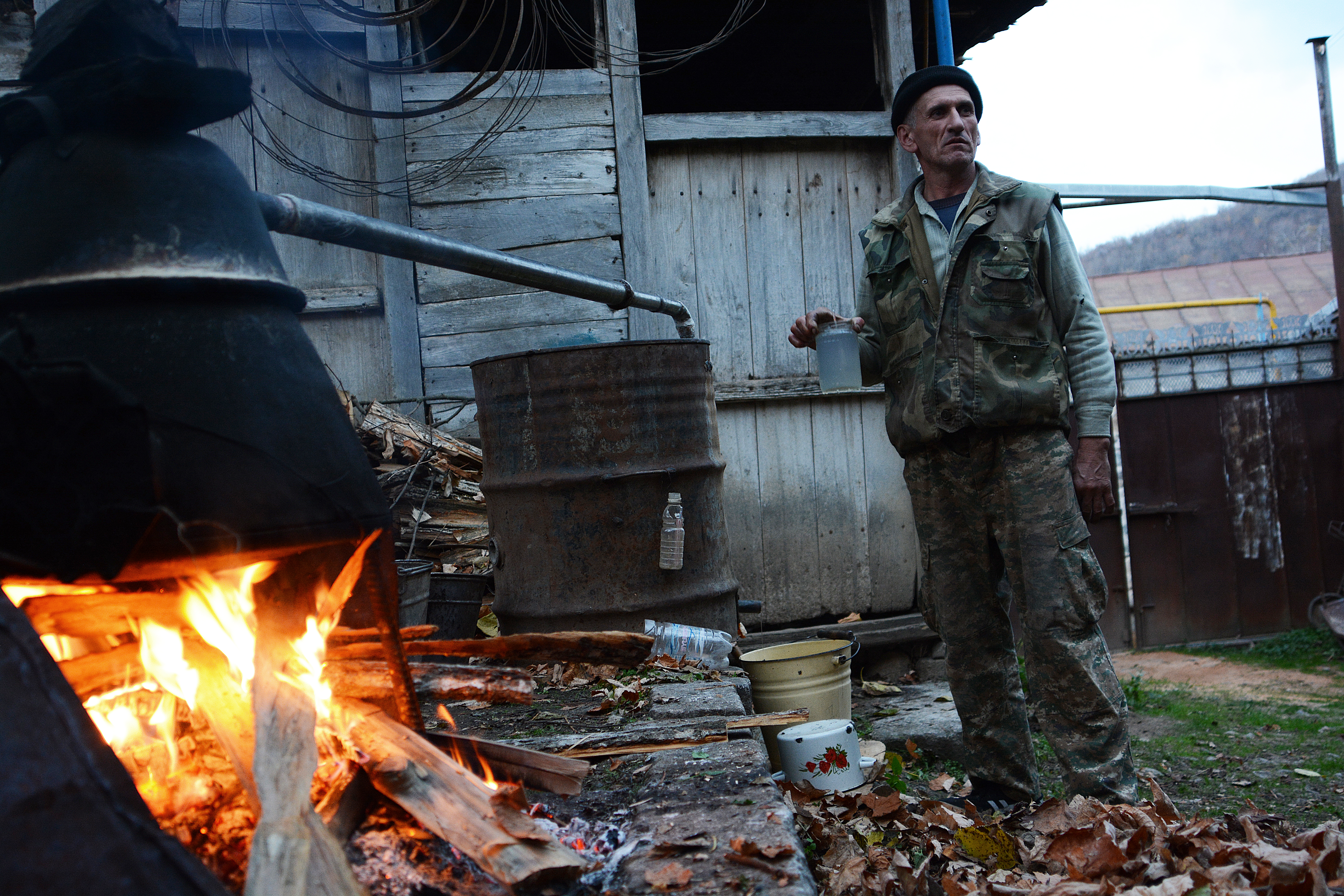
Vodka production in the village

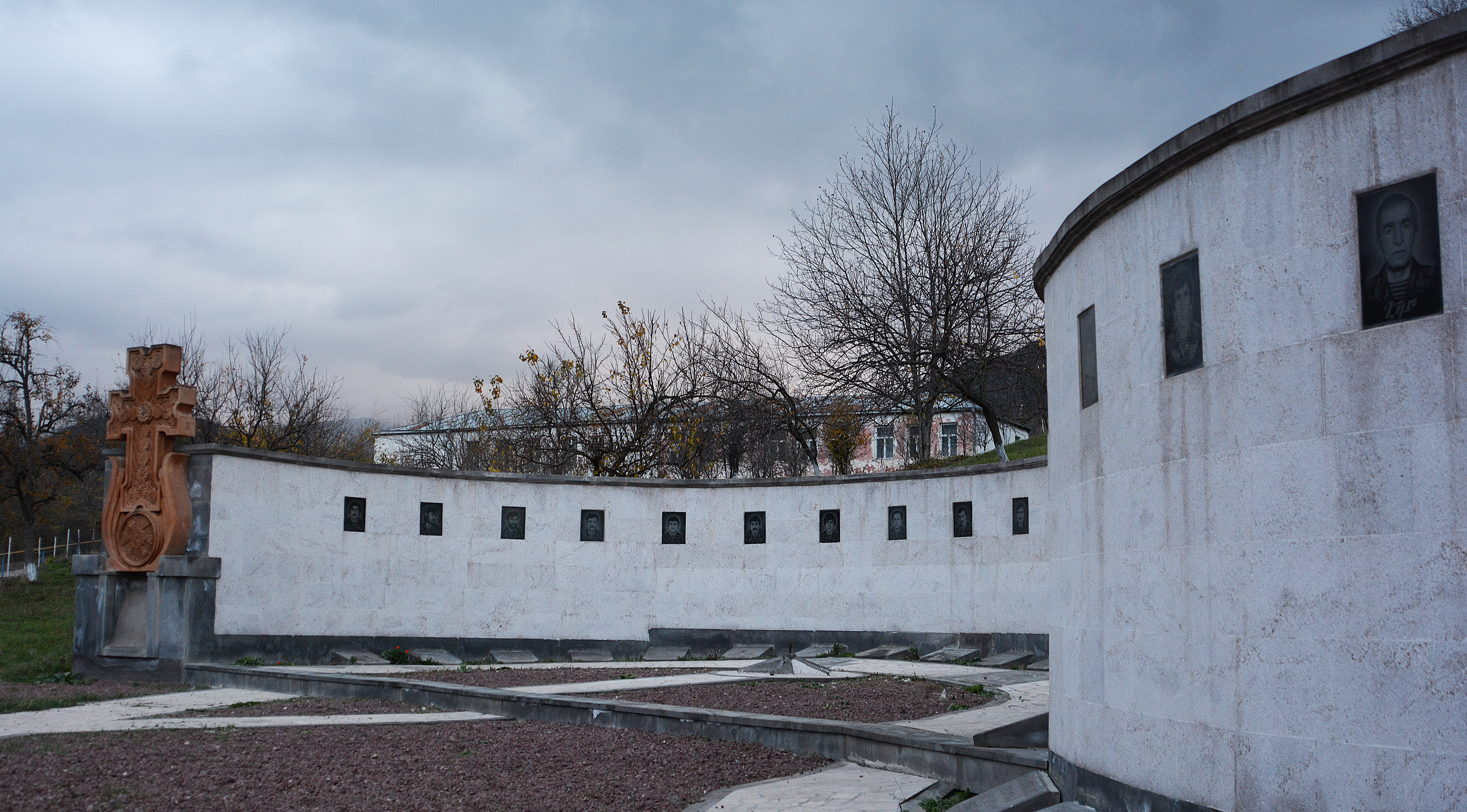
A monument to victims of the Nagorno-Karabakh conflict

Scenery

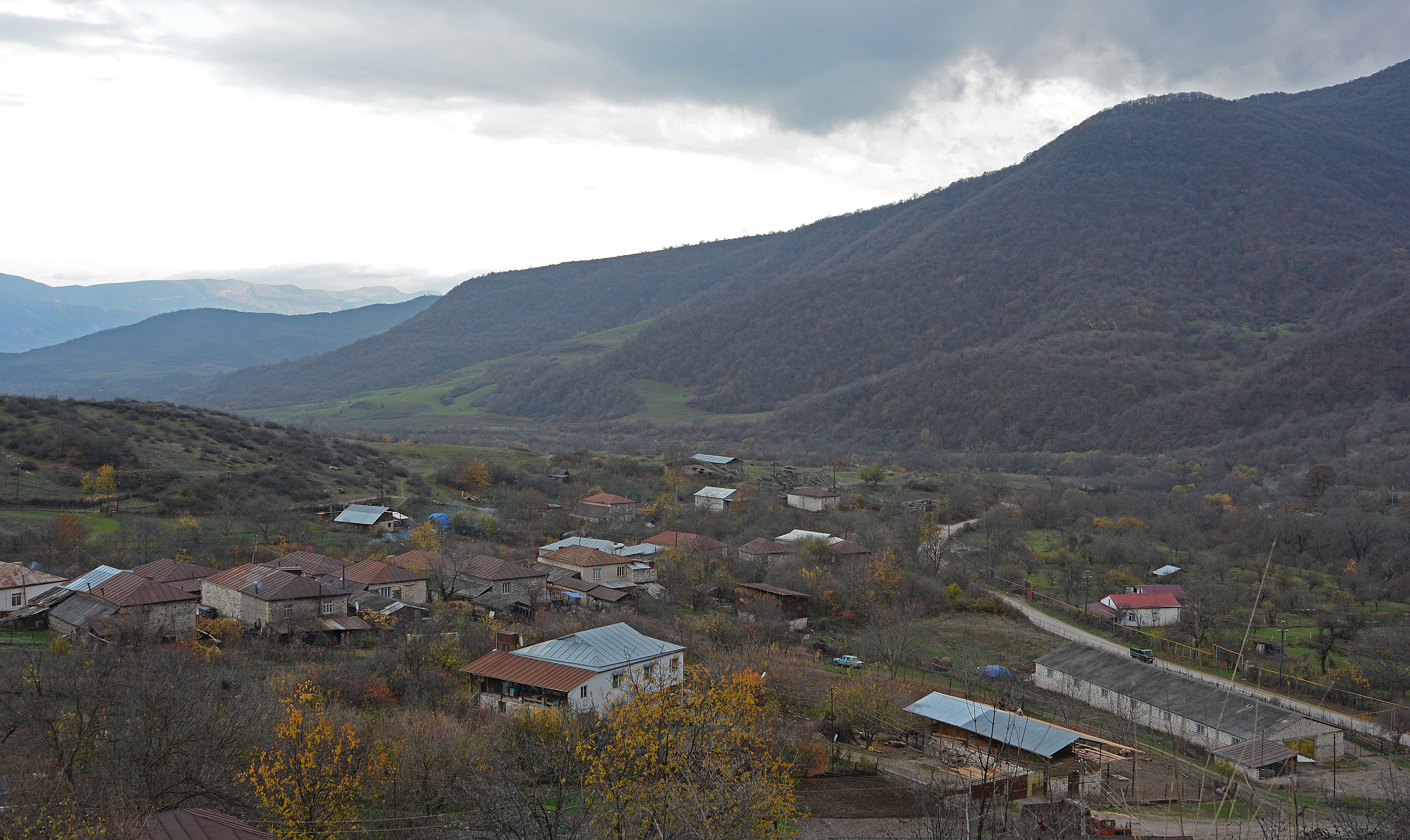
Panorama

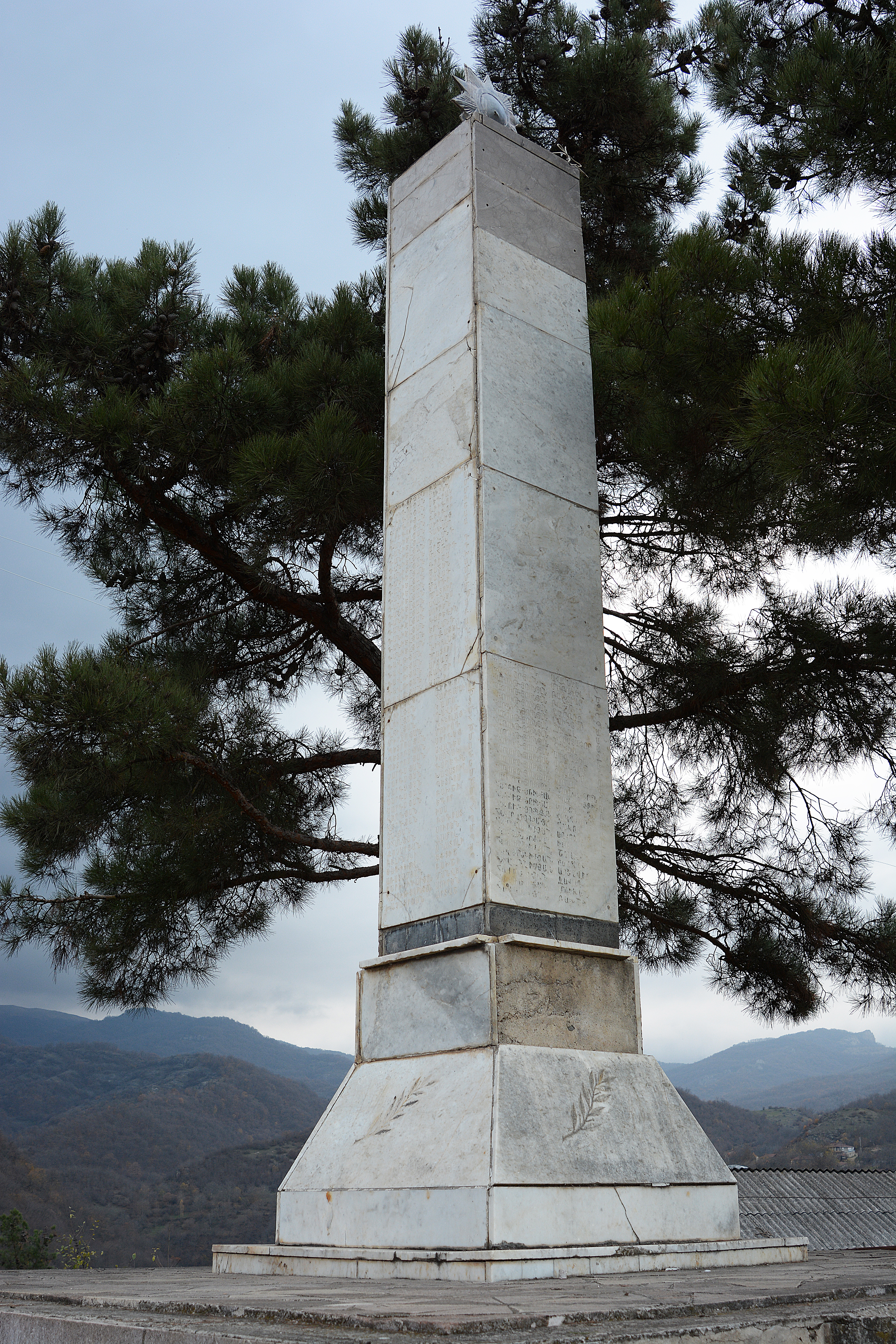
Monument

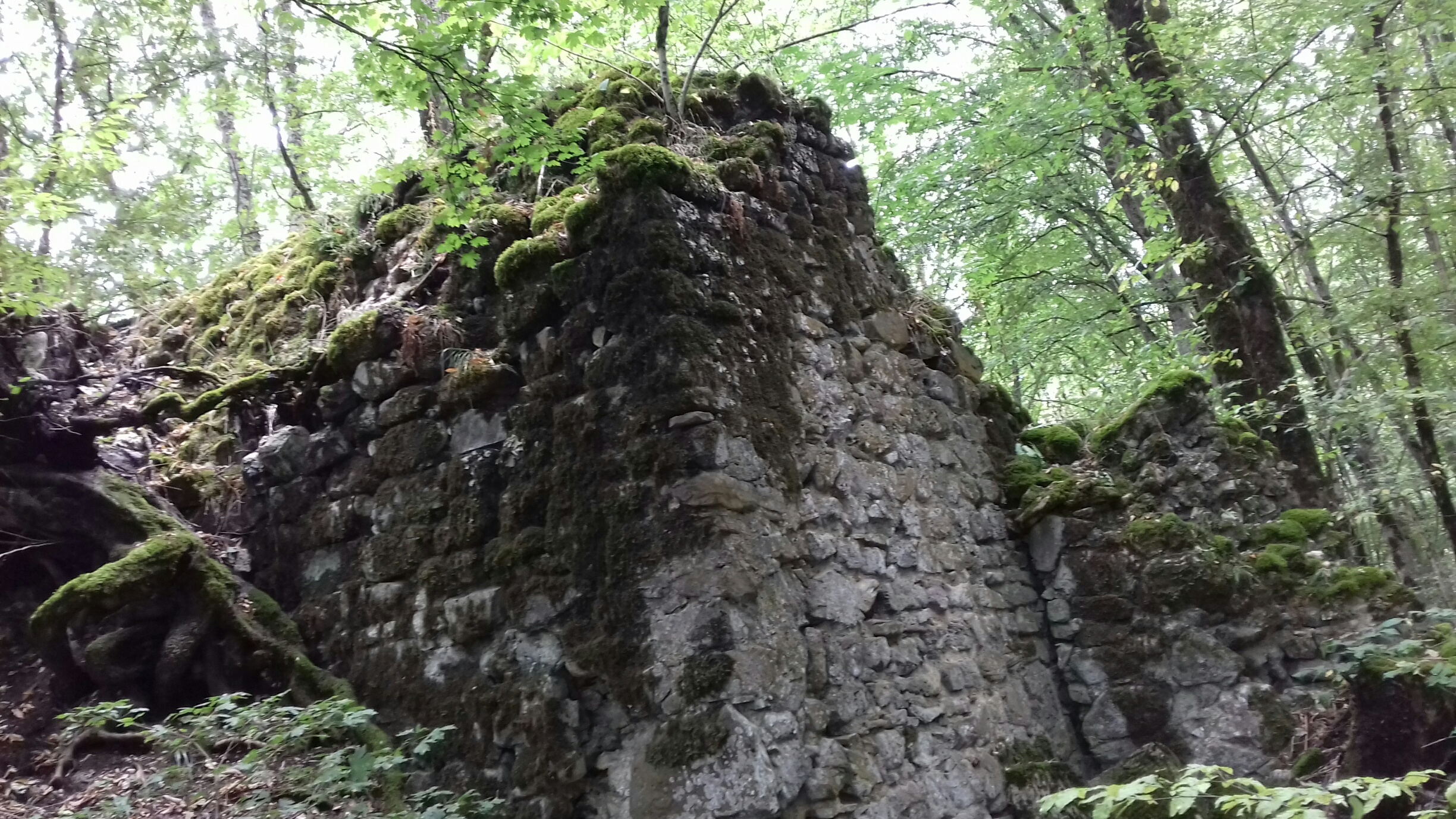
The 12th/13th-century Okhty Yeghtsi Monastery
