= Astghashen =

Astghashen / Dashbulag Աստղաշեն / Daşbulaq
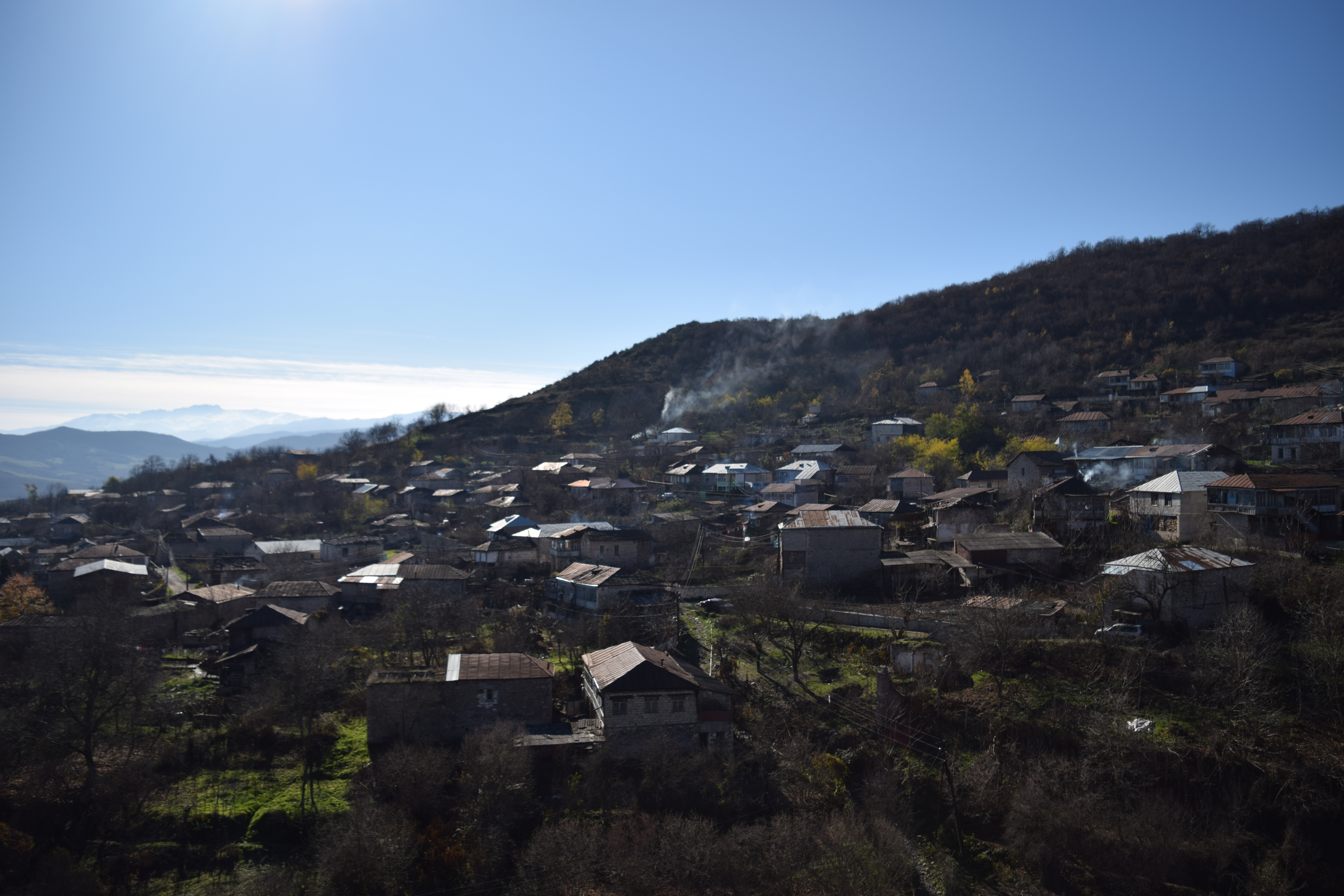

- Location within Azerbaijan Location within Karabakh Economic Region
- Coordinates: 39°55′37″N 46°42′17″E
- Country: Azerbaijan
  - District: Khojaly
- Elevation: 772 m (2,533 ft)

Population (2015)
  - Total: 507
- Time zone: UTC+4 (AZT)

Astghashen (Armenian: Աստղաշեն) or Dashbulag (Armenian: Դաշբուլաղ; Azerbaijani: Daşbulaq) is a village in the region of Nagorno-Karabakh, in the Khojaly District of Azerbaijan. The village is famous for its unique star-shaped stones, which the village derives its name from. Until 2023 it was controlled by the breakaway Republic of Artsakh. The village had an ethnic Armenian-majority population until the expulsion of the Armenian population of Nagorno-Karabakh by Azerbaijan following the 2023 Azerbaijani offensive in Nagorno-Karabakh.

== Toponymy ==
The village was historically known as Karaghbyur (Armenian: Քարաղբյուր). The name Astghashen means "village of stars", with the word Astgh (Armenian: Աստղ) meaning "star" in Armenian, referring to the famous star-shaped fossils of the village.

== History ==
The village is known for its star-shaped fossils. The fossils originate from small marine animals that lived in the Tethys Ocean that covered the area millions of years ago. There are also many other types of fossils in the area.

During the Soviet period, the village was a part of the Askeran District in the Nagorno-Karabakh Autonomous Oblast of Azerbaijan SSR. The village has been administered by the Republic of Artsakh as a part of its Askeran Province since the First Nagorno-Karabakh War.

After the 2020 Nagorno-Karabakh war, Artsakh launched the construction of a new settlement for IDPs close to Astghashen, on the road towards the neighboring village of Patara, for people displaced from the villages of Sghnakh, Jraghatsner, Madatashen and Moshkhmhat in the Askeran Province.

== Historical heritage sites ==
Historical heritage sites in and around the village include burial sites from the 2nd–1st millennia BCE, a 14th-century tomb about 4 km southwest of the village, St. George's Church (Armenian: Սուրբ Գևորգ եկեղեցի, romanized: Surb Gevorg Yekeghetsi) built in 1898, with two 16th/17th-century khachkars, and a spring monument from 1930.

In June 2026 it was reported that the World War II memorial and the memorial to the first Karabkah war had been demolished by Azerbaijan.

== Economy and culture ==
The population is mainly engaged in agriculture and animal husbandry. As of 2015, the village has a municipal building, a secondary school, a house of culture, two shops, and a medical centre. The Astghashen Art School is also located in the village.

== Demographics ==
The village had 520 inhabitants in 2005, and 507 inhabitants in 2015.

As of December 2025, the 34 Azerbaijani families, totaling 133 individuals, have been resettled in the village by Azerbaijan.

== Gallery ==
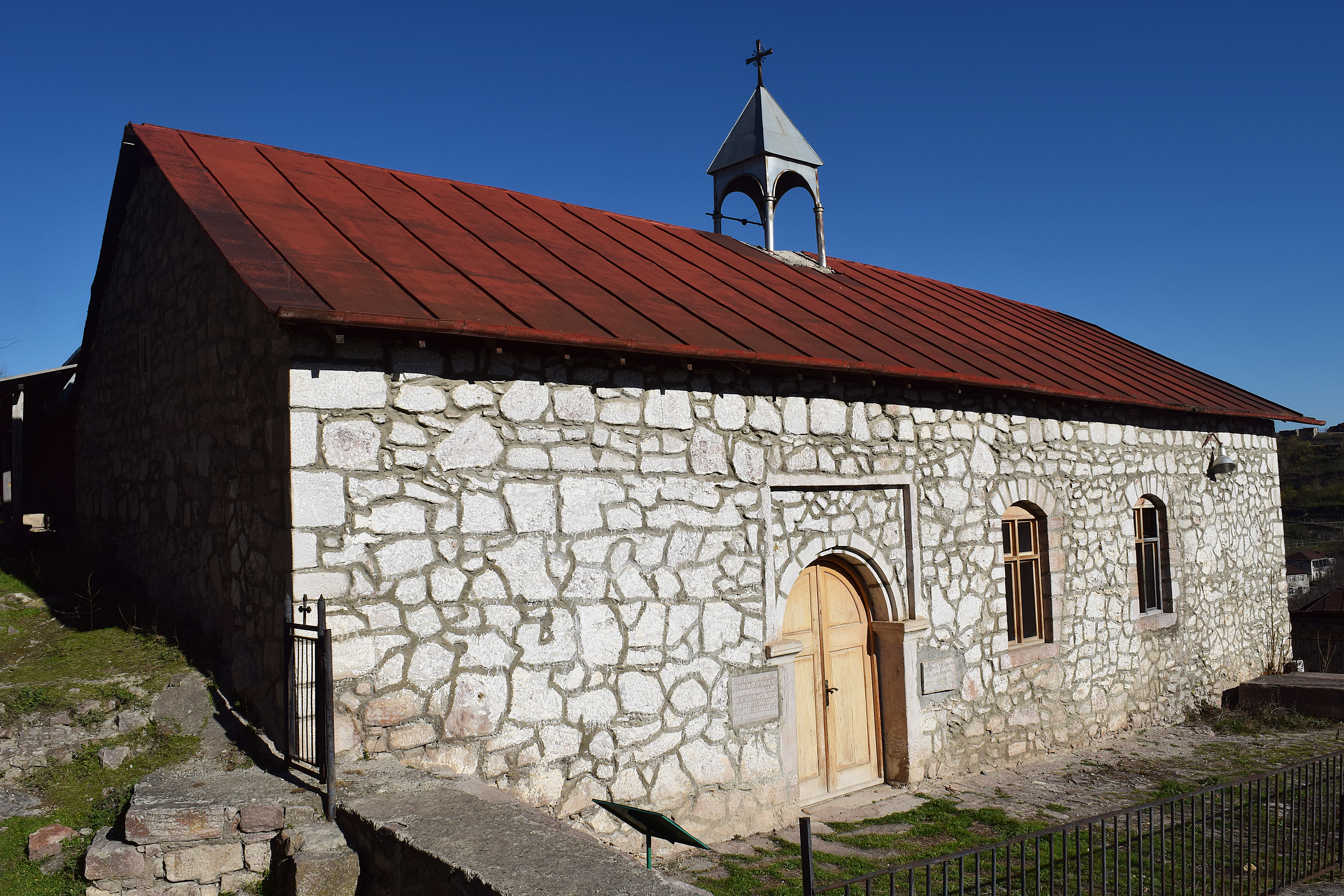
St. George's Church in Astghashen

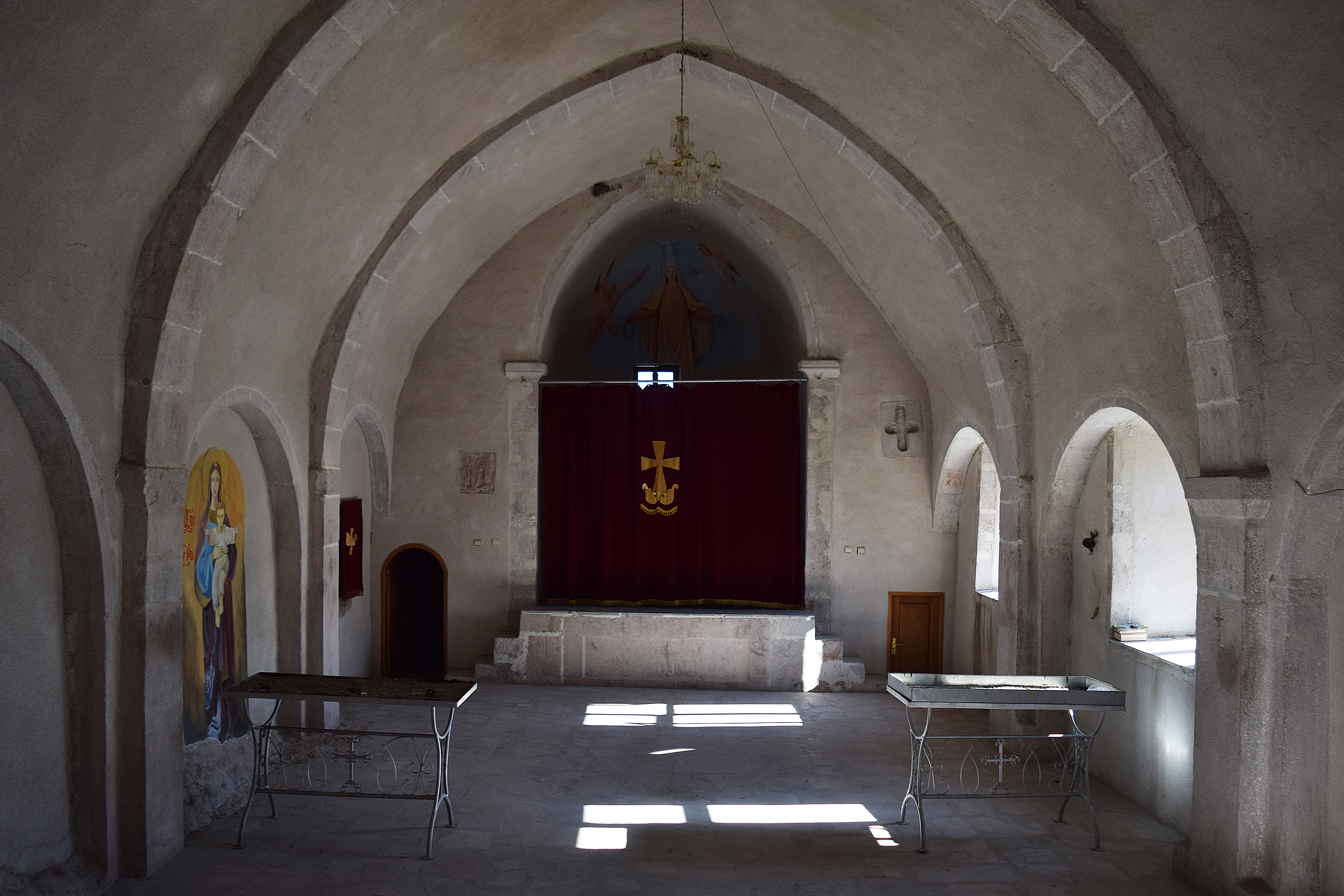
Inside St. George's Church

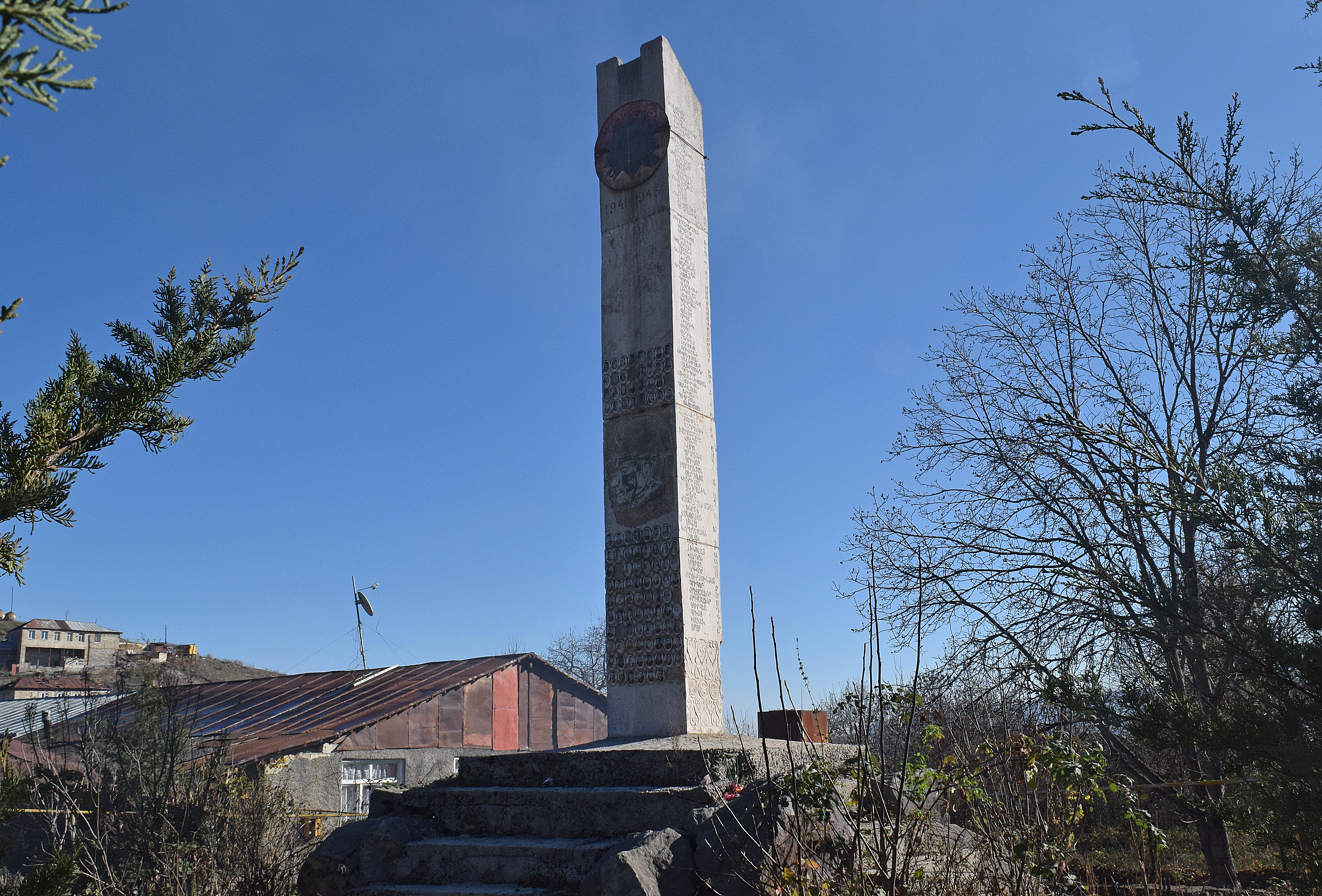
Monument to the victims of the Great Patriotic War (WWII)

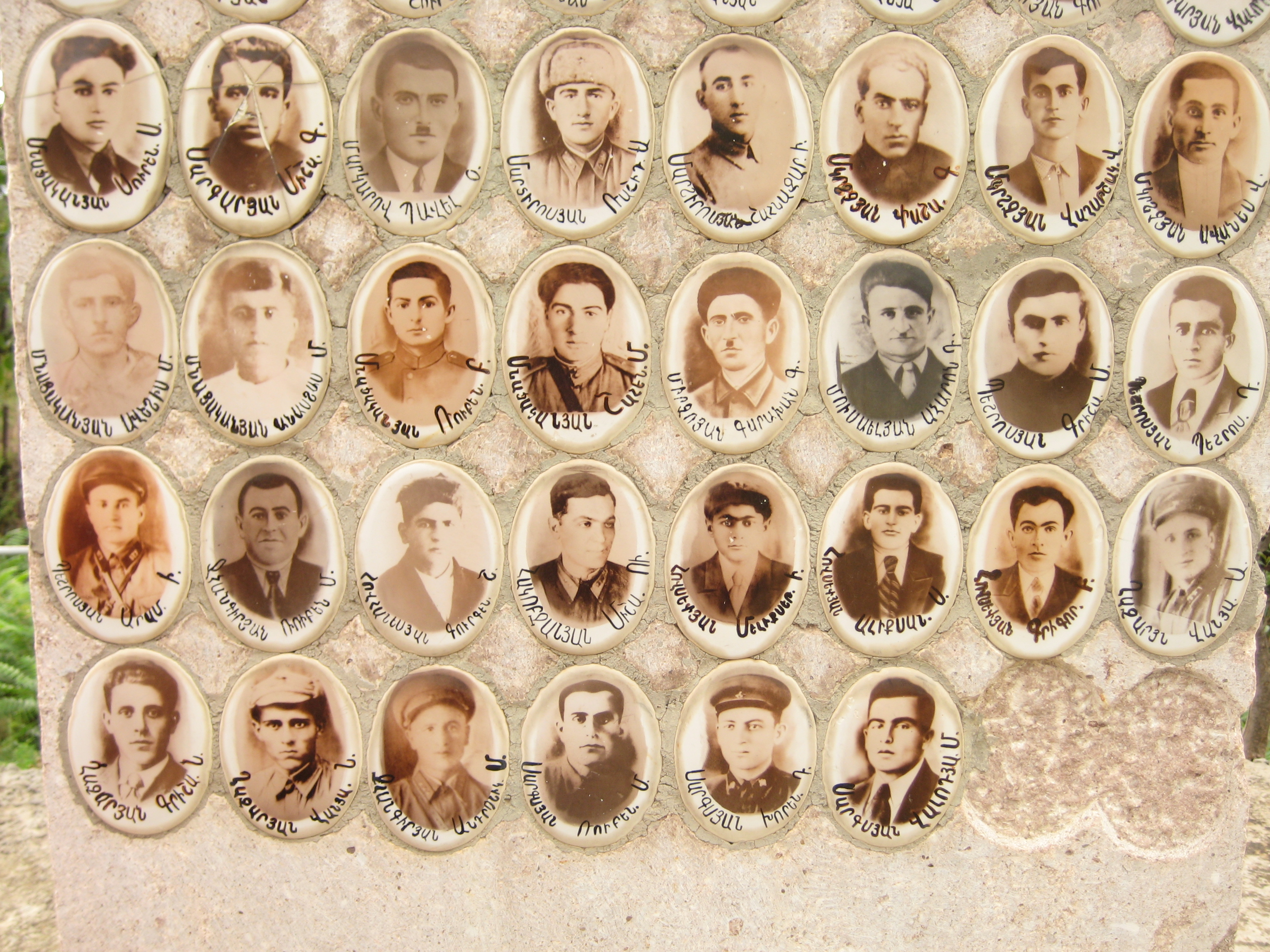
Closeup of monument to the victims of the Great Patriotic War (WWII)

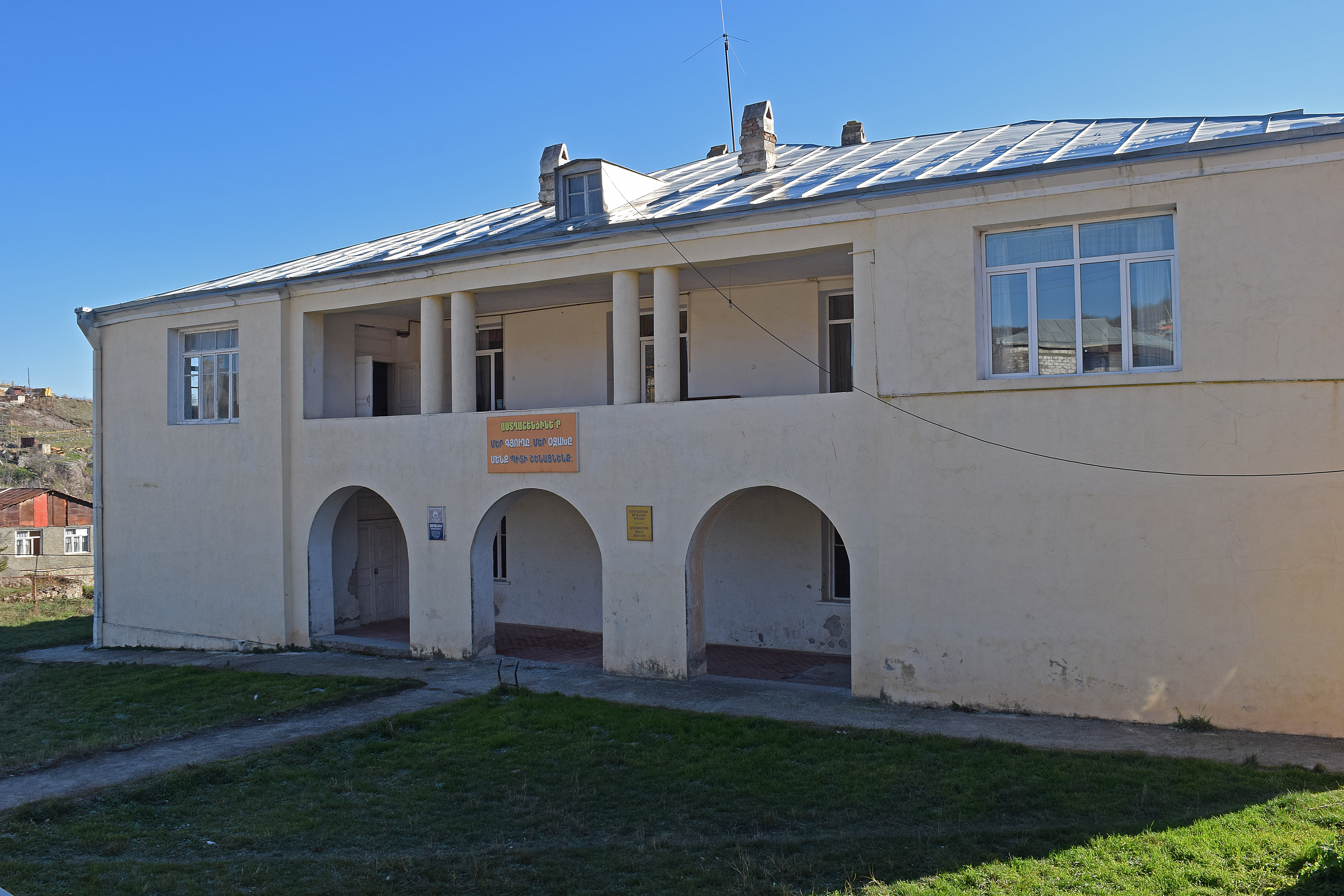
Municipal building in Astghashen

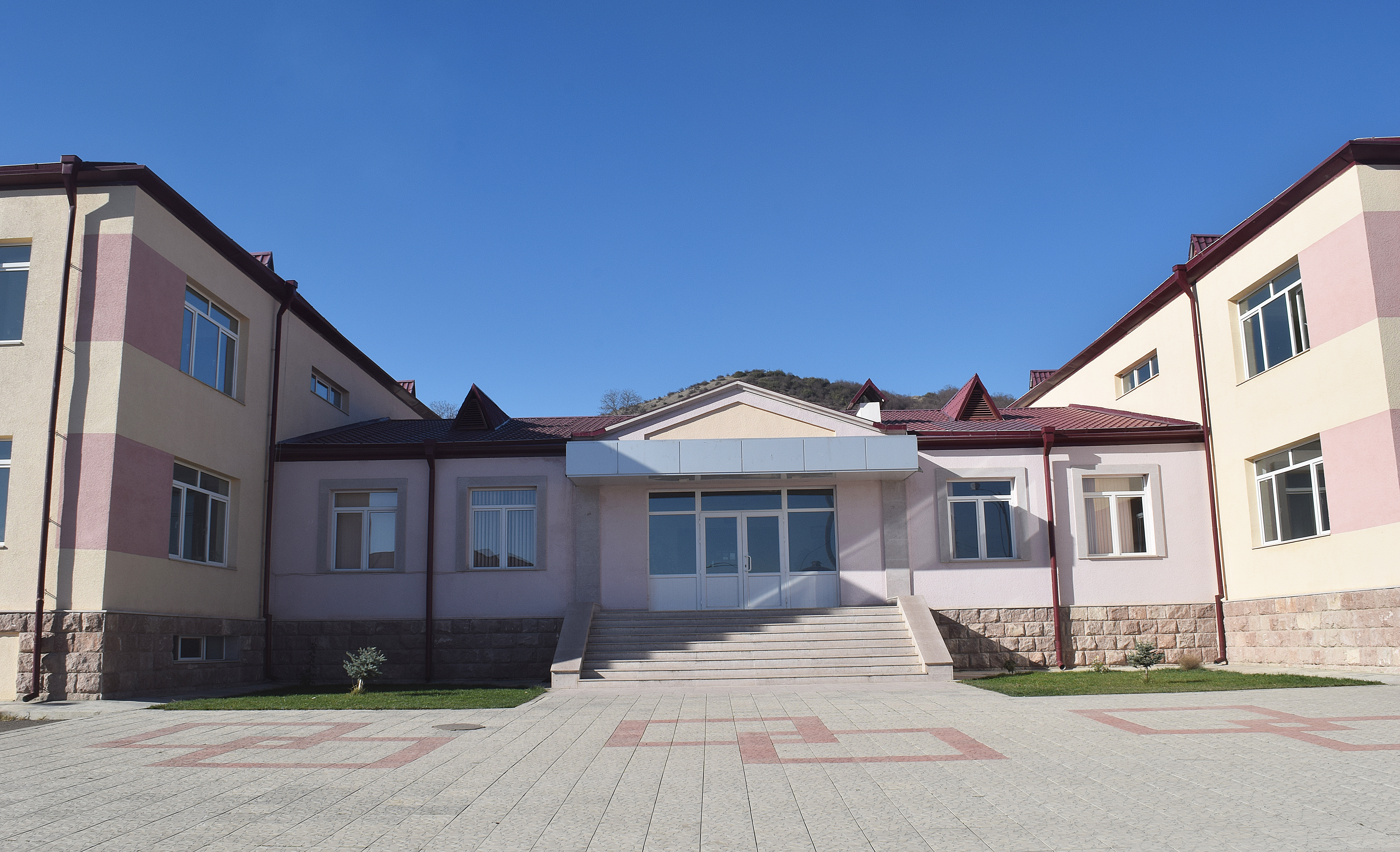
School entrance

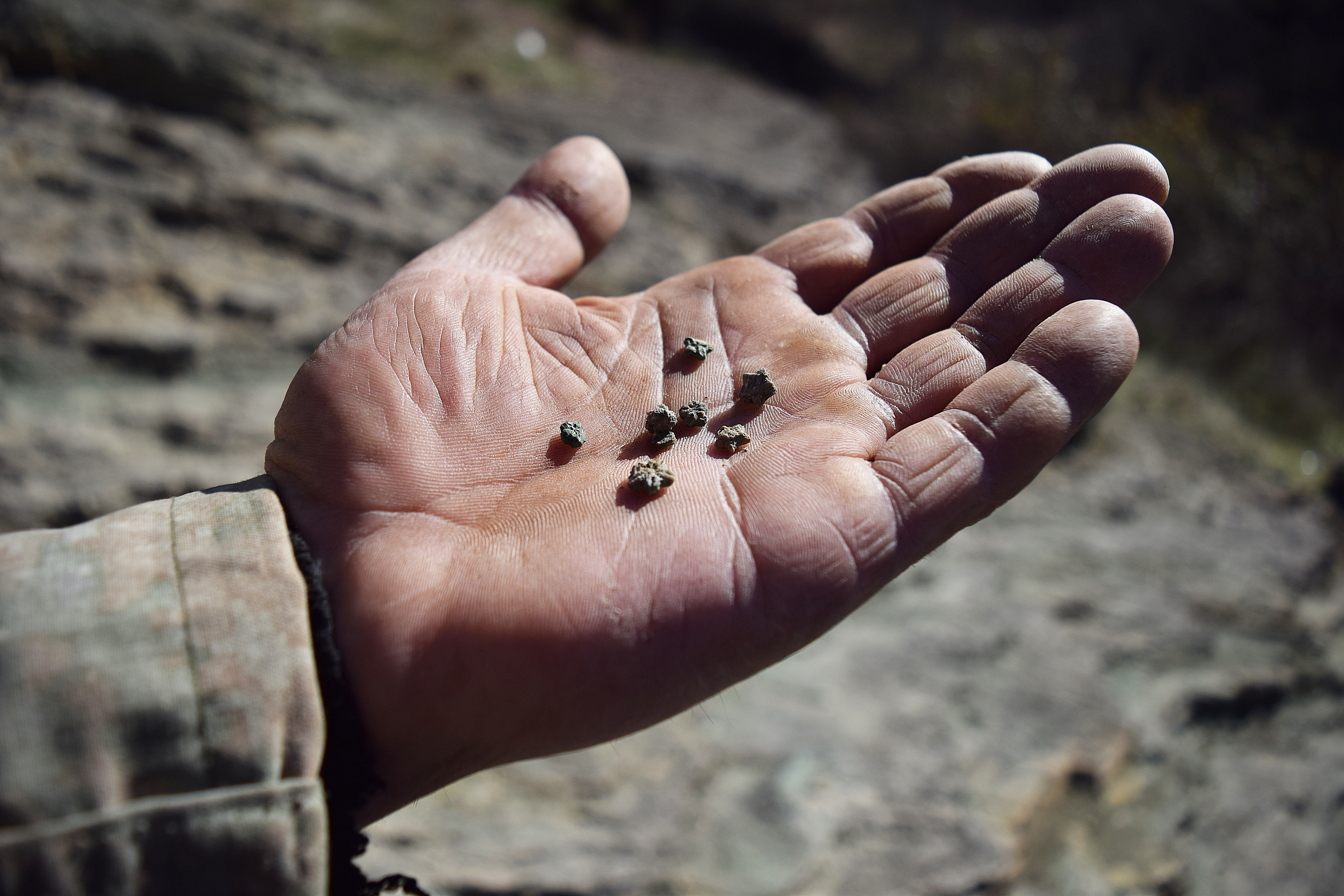
The famous star-shaped fossils of the village
