= Nerkin Sznek, Nagorno-Karabakh =

Nerkin Sznek / Ashagy Yemishjan Ներքին Սզնեք / Aşağı Yemişcan
- Location within Azerbaijan Location within Karabakh Economic Region
- Coordinates: 39°44′27.8″N 46°50′24.8″E
- Country: Azerbaijan
  - District: Khojaly
- Elevation: 1,032 m (3,386 ft)

Population (2015)
  - Total: 131
- Time zone: UTC+4 (AZT)

Nerkin Sznek (Armenian: Ներքին Սզնեք) or Ashagy Yemishjan (Azerbaijani: Aşağı Yemişcan) is a village in the Khojaly District of Azerbaijan, in the region of Nagorno-Karabakh. Until 2023 it was controlled by the breakaway Republic of Artsakh. The village had an ethnic Armenian-majority population until the expulsion of the Armenian population of Nagorno-Karabakh by Azerbaijan following the 2023 Azerbaijani offensive in Nagorno-Karabakh.

== History ==
During the Soviet period, the village was part of the Askeran District of the Nagorno-Karabakh Autonomous Oblast.

== Historical heritage sites ==
Historical heritage sites in and around the village include an 18th/19th-century cemetery, the church of Surb Astvatsatsin (Armenian: Սուրբ Աստվածածին, lit. 'Holy Mother of God') built in 1849, a 19th-century watermill, and a 19th-century spring monument.

== Economy and culture ==
The population is mainly engaged in agriculture and animal husbandry. As of 2015, the village has a municipal building, a house of culture, a medical centre, and a secondary school that is shared with the neighboring village of Verin Sznek.

== Demographics ==
The village has an ethnic Armenian-majority population, had 129 inhabitants in 2005, and 131 inhabitants in 2015.
