= Baharlı, Khojaly =

Baharly / Moshkhmhat Baharlı / Մոշխմհատ
- Location within Azerbaijan Location within Karabakh Economic Region
- Coordinates: 39°40′59″N 46°51′07″E
- Country: Azerbaijan
- District: Khojaly

Population (2015)
  - Total: 64
- Time zone: UTC+4 (AZT)

Baharly (Azerbaijani: Baharlı; formerly Quşçubaba) or Moshkhmhat (Armenian: Մոշխմհատ, Azerbaijani: Moşxmhat) is a village in the Khojaly District of Azerbaijan. The village had an ethnic Armenian-majority population prior to the 2020 Nagorno-Karabakh war, and also had an Armenian majority in 1989.

== History ==
During the Soviet period, the village was part of the Askeran District of the Nagorno-Karabakh Autonomous Oblast. After the First Nagorno-Karabakh War, the village was administrated as part of the Askeran Province of the breakaway Republic of Artsakh. The village was captured by Azerbaijan on 7 November 2020, during the 2020 Nagorno-Karabakh war.

== Historical heritage sites ==
Historical heritage sites in and around the village include the monastery of Ghevondyats Anapat (Armenian: Ղևոնդյաց անապատ, also known as the monastery of Ghondik, Ղոնդիկ) from between the 5th and 19th centuries, a 12th/13th-century khachkar, a 17th-century spring monument, a 17th/18th-century bridge, a 19th-century cemetery, a 19th-century watermill, and the 19th-century church of Surb Astvatsatsin (Armenian: Սուրբ Աստվածածին, lit. 'Holy Mother of God').

== Demographics ==
The village had 61 inhabitants in 2005, and 64 inhabitants in 2015.
