= Mədədkənd =

Madadkend / Madatashen Mədədkənd / Մադաթաշեն
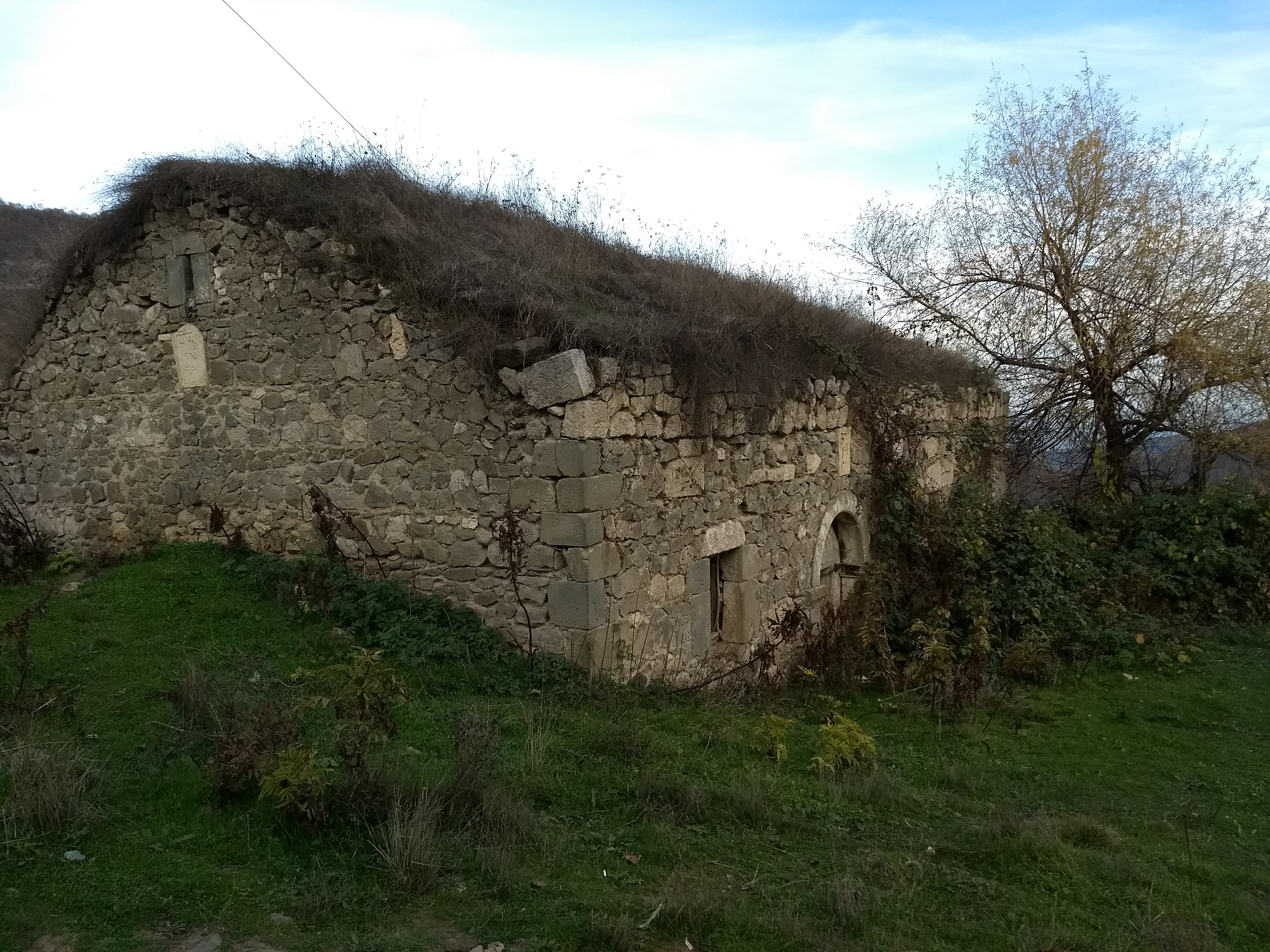

- Location within Azerbaijan
- Coordinates: 39°41′54″N 46°50′34″E
- Country: Azerbaijan
- District: Khojaly

Population (2015)
  - Total: 104
- Time zone: UTC+4 (AZT)

Madadkend (Azerbaijani: Mədədkənd) or Madatashen (Armenian: Մադաթաշեն) is a village in the Khojaly District of Azerbaijan, in the disputed region of Nagorno-Karabakh. The village had an ethnic Armenian-majority population prior to the 2020 Nagorno-Karabakh war, and also had an Armenian majority in 1989.

== History ==
During the Soviet period, the village was part of the Askeran District of the Nagorno-Karabakh Autonomous Oblast. After the First Nagorno-Karabakh War, the village was administrated as part of the Askeran Province of the breakaway Republic of Artsakh. The village was captured by Azerbaijan during the 2020 Nagorno-Karabakh war. Subsequently, videos emerged online showing Azerbaijani forces committing a war crime by decapitating 69-year old Armenian Genadi Petrosyan.

== Historical heritage sites ==
Historical heritage sites in and around the village include a 17th-century bridge, a 17th-century spring monument, an 18th/19th-century cemetery, a 19th-century watermill, and the 19th-century church of Surb Astvatsatsin (Armenian: Սուրբ Աստվածածին, lit. 'Holy Mother of God').

== Demographics ==
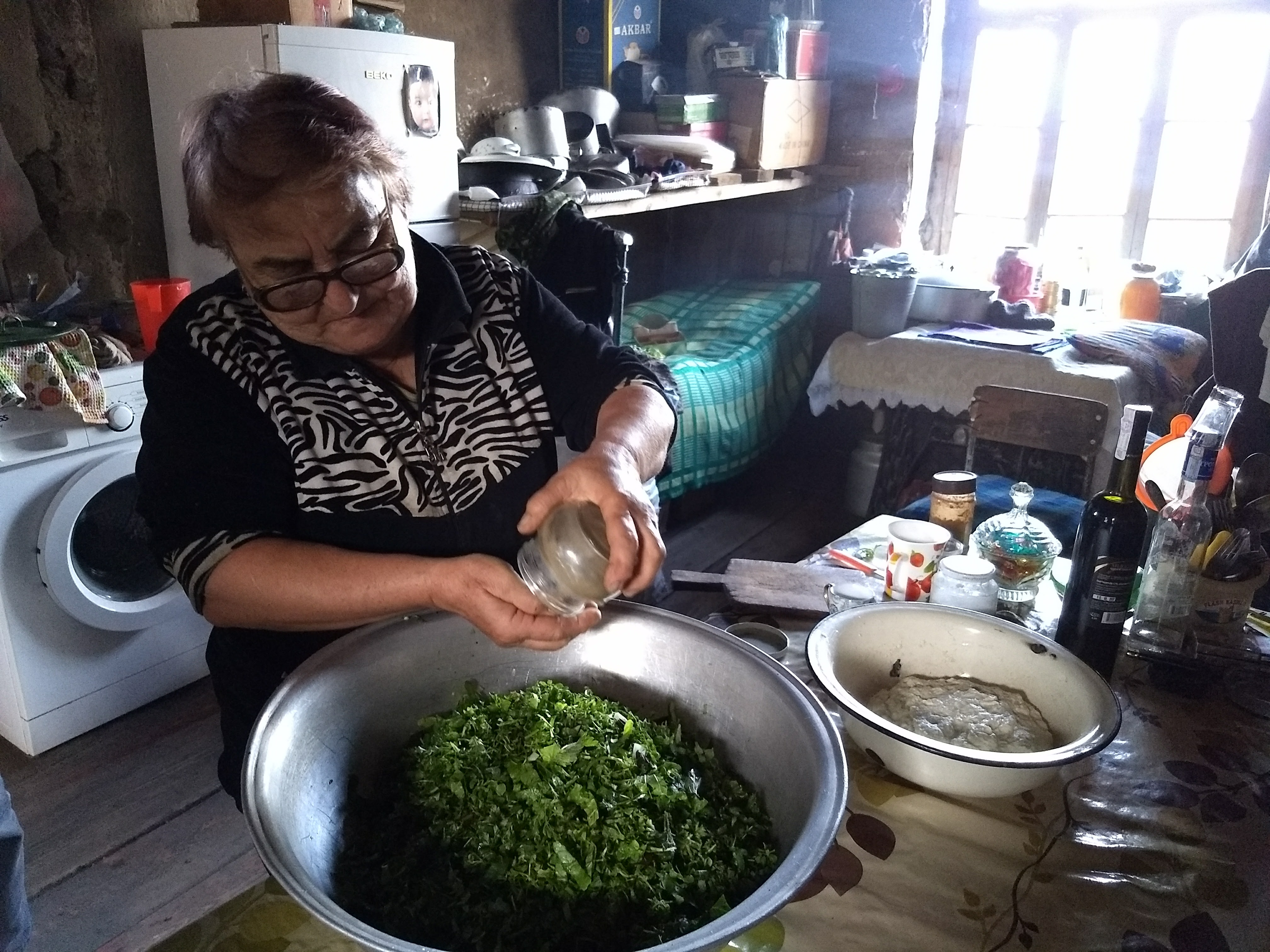
Armenian villager making jengyalov hats in Madatashen village

The village had 94 inhabitants in 2005, and 104 inhabitants in 2015.
