= Dəmirçilər, Khojaly =

Damirchilar / Jraghatsner Dəmirçilər / Ջրաղացներ
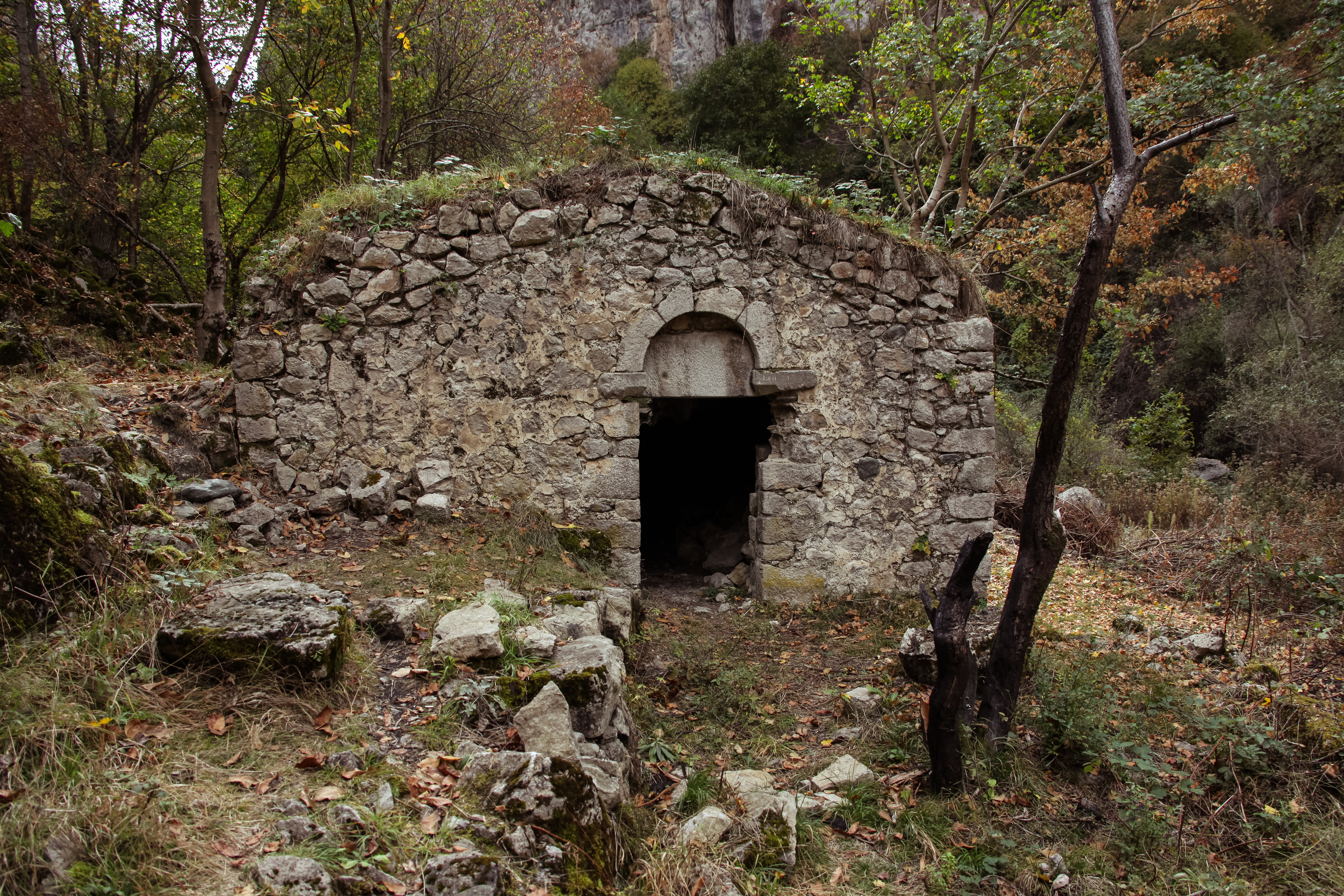
- Ruins of Hunot mills near the village

- Location within Azerbaijan Location within Karabakh Economic Region
- Coordinates: 39°42′47″N 46°50′30″E
- Country: Azerbaijan
- District: Khojaly

Population (2015)
  - Total: 132
- Time zone: UTC+4 (AZT)

Damirchilar (Azerbaijani: Dəmirçilər) or Jraghatsner (Armenian: Ջրաղացներ) is a village in the Khojaly District of Azerbaijan. The village had an ethnic Armenian-majority population prior to the 2020 Nagorno-Karabakh war, and also had an Armenian majority in 1989. It was under the de facto control of breakaway Republic of Artsakh until the Azerbaijani offensive in the region in 2023.

== History ==
During the Soviet period, the village was part of the Askeran District of the Nagorno-Karabakh Autonomous Oblast. After the First Nagorno-Karabakh War, the village was administrated as part of the Askeran Province of the breakaway Republic of Artsakh. The village was captured by Azerbaijan on 9 November 2020, during the 2020 Nagorno-Karabakh war.

== Historical heritage sites ==
Historical heritage sites in and around the village include the Banunts Church (Armenian: Բանունց եկեղեցի, romanized: Banunts Yekeghetsi), the 13th-century church of Surb Vanes (Armenian: Սուրբ Վանես), and the church of Surb Astvatsatsin (Armenian: Սուրբ Աստվածածին, lit. 'Holy Mother of God') built in 1882.

== Demographics ==
The village had 117 inhabitants in 2005, and 132 inhabitants in 2015.
