= Sığnaq =

Sighnag / Sghnakh Sığnaq / Սղնախ
- Location within Azerbaijan Location within Karabakh Economic Region
- Coordinates: 39°43′16″N 46°47′59″E
- Country: Azerbaijan
- District: Khojaly
- Elevation: 1,302 m (4,272 ft)

Population (2015)
  - Total: 292
- Time zone: UTC+4 (AZT)

Sighnag (Azerbaijani: Sığnaq) or Sghnakh (Armenian: Սղնախ) is a village in the Khojaly District of Azerbaijan. The village had an ethnic Armenian-majority population prior to the 2020 Nagorno-Karabakh war, and also had an Armenian majority in 1989.

== History ==
During the Soviet period, the village was a part of the Askeran District of the Nagorno-Karabakh Autonomous Oblast. After the First Nagorno-Karabakh War, the village was administrated as part of the Askeran Province of the breakaway Republic of Artsakh. The village was captured by Azerbaijan on 9 November 2020 during the 2020 Nagorno-Karabakh war.

In early July 2021, satellite images released by Caucasus Heritage Watch, a watchdog group made up of researchers from Purdue and Cornell, revealed that an Armenian cemetery dating back to the eighteenth century was bulldozed in order to make way for a new road. This makes it the "second historic cemetery destroyed along the new Fuzuli-Shusha road, after Mets T’agher/Böyük Tağlar."

== Historical heritage sites ==
Historical heritage sites in and around the village include the 19th-century church of Surb Astvatsatsin (Armenian: Սուրբ Աստվածածին, lit. 'Holy Mother of God'), a 19th-century cemetery, and a spring monument built in 1949.

== Demographics ==
The village had 251 inhabitants in 2005, and 292 inhabitants in 2015.
