= Askeran District (NKAO) =

Coordinates: 39°56′12″N 46°49′58″E

- District
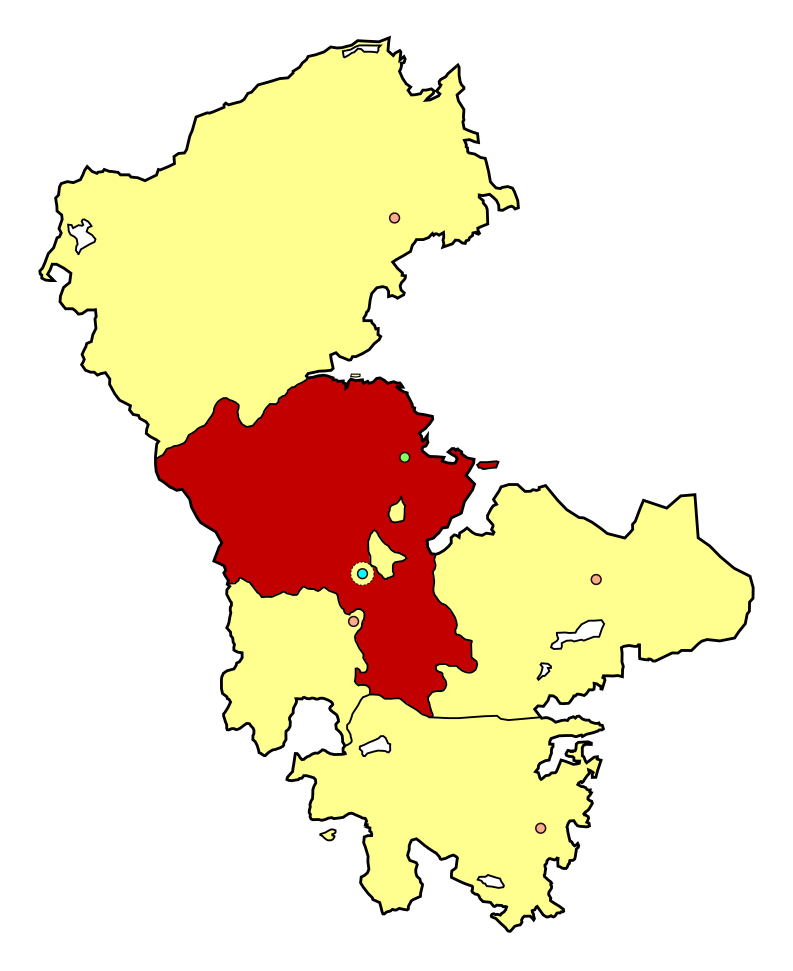
- Map of Askeran within the NKAO
- Autonomous region: (Azerbaijan Soviet Socialist Republic) Nagorno-Karabakh Autonomous Oblast
- Country: Azerbaijan SSR
- Abolished: 26 November 1991
- Capital: Askeran

Population (1979)
  - Total: 20,094

Askeran District (Azerbaijani: Əsgəran rayonu, Әсҝәран рајону; Armenian: Ասկերանի շրջան, romanized: Askerani shrjan) was an administrative unit within the former Nagorno-Karabakh Autonomous Oblast (NKAO) of the Azerbaijan Soviet Socialist Republic.

== History ==
The capital of the district was the town of Askeran. Until 1978 the district was called the Stepanakert District and its capital was Stepanakert.

The Nagorno-Karabakh Autonomous Oblast was abolished on 26 November 1991. The district was renamed Khojaly District.

Following the First Nagorno-Karabakh war, all of the district came under the control of the self-proclaimed Republic of Artsakh and was incorporated into its Askeran Province. However, following the 2020 Nagorno-Karabakh war, Azerbaijan recaptured parts of the district and after September 2023 offensive they gained the full control of the region.

== Demographics ==
Historical ethnic composition of the Askeran District
Ethnic group	1926 census		1939 census		1959 census		1970 census		1979 census	
Ethnic group	Number	%	Number	%	Number	%	Number	%	Number	%
Armenians	26,702	99.68	26,881	91.68 ▼	17,693	85.50 ▼	15,642	79.93 ▼	14,772	73.51 ▼
Azerbaijanis	22	0.08	2,014	6.87 ▲	2,884	13.94 ▲	3,785	19.34 ▲	5,231	26.03 ▲
Russians	9	0.03	305	1.04 ▲	75	0.36 ▼	6	0.03 ▼	53	0.26 ▲
Others	55	0.21	121	0.41 ▲	42	0.20 ▼	137	0.70 ▲	38	0.19 ▼
TOTAL	26,788	100.00	29,321	100.00	20,694	100.00	19,570	100.00	20,094	100.00
