= Agarunov =

Agarunov is a surname. Notable people with the surname include:

- Albert Agarunov (1969–1992), Starshina of the Azerbaijani Army
- Yakov Agarunov (1907–1992), Mountain Jew poet

== See also ==
- Monument to Albert Agarunov
