= Ghazanchetsots Cathedral =

Armenian cathedral in Shusha, Azerbaijan

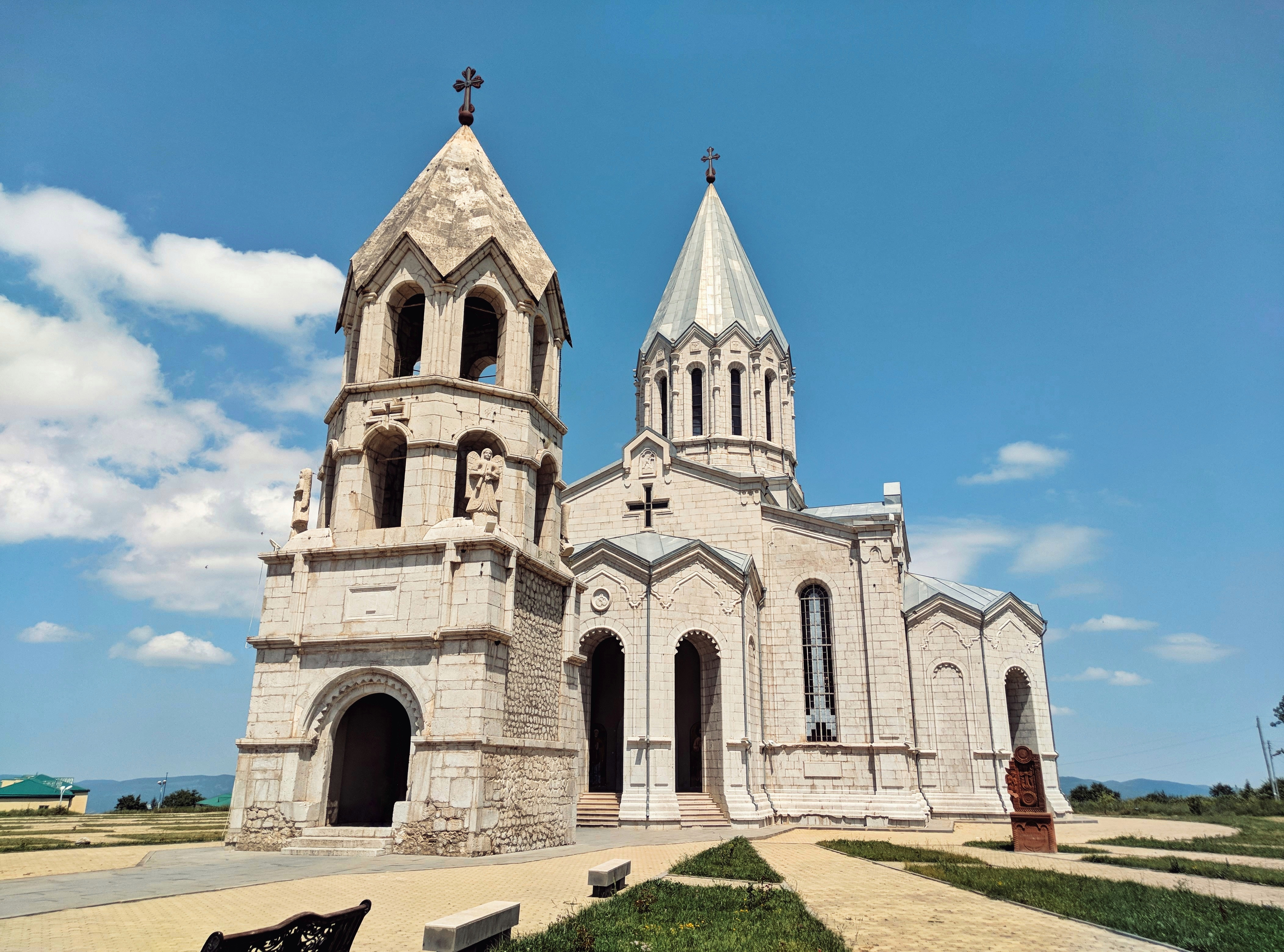
- The cathedral in 2018, two years prior the damage in the 2020 Nagorno-Karabakh war

- Location within Azerbaijan Location within Karabakh Economic Region

Religion
- Affiliation: Armenian Apostolic Church
- Rite: Armenian
- Year consecrated: 20 September 1888; 18 June 1998 (reconsecration)
- Status: Damaged, conversion work ongoing according to the Azerbaijani government

Location
- Location: 19 A. Ghazanchetsots Street, Shusha, Azerbaijan
- Coordinates: 39.758819°N 46.747883°E

Architecture
- Architect: Simon Ter-Hakobian(ts)
- Style: Armenian
- Groundbreaking: 1868
- Completed: 1887

Specifications
- Length: 34.7 metres (114 ft)
- Width: 23 metres (75 ft)
- Height (max): 35 metres (115 ft)

Holy Savior Cathedral (Armenian: Սուրբ Ամենափրկիչ մայր տաճար, Surb Amenap′rkich mayr tachar), commonly referred to as Ghazanchetsots (Armenian: Ղազանչեցոց), (Note: Also spelled Ghazanchetzotz, Gazanchetsots (Russian: Газанчецоц), Kazanchetsots (Russian: Казанчецоц). In Azerbaijani: Kazançetsots/Qazançetsots or Qazançı kilsəsi.) is an Armenian Apostolic cathedral in Shusha in Azerbaijan. It is the cathedra of the Diocese of Artsakh of the Armenian Apostolic Church. Standing 35 metres (115 ft) high, Ghazanchetsots is one of the largest Armenian churches in the world. A landmark of Shusha and the Karabakh region, and of Armenian cultural and religious identity, it was listed as a cultural and historical monument of the former breakaway Republic of Artsakh.

Built between 1868 and 1887, the cathedral was consecrated in 1888. It was damaged during the March 1920 massacre of the city's Armenians—and the destruction of their half of the city—by Azerbaijanis and experienced a decades-long decline well into the Soviet period. During the first Nagorno-Karabakh War Azerbaijan used the cathedral as an armoury to store hundreds of missiles. The cathedral was extensively restored in the aftermath of the first war and reconsecrated in 1998. During the 2020 war, it was damaged by Azerbaijani attacks.

In Azerbaijan, the cathedral is called "Gazanchy" (Azerbaijani: Qazançı) and the authorities have often denied its Armenian heritage, instead vaguely referring to it as "Christian" or falsely labeling it a "Russian Orthodox" edifice. Azerbaijan's announcement of a "renovation", which so far has included the removal of its conical roof, has been met with criticism and concern by different bodies.

== Foundation ==
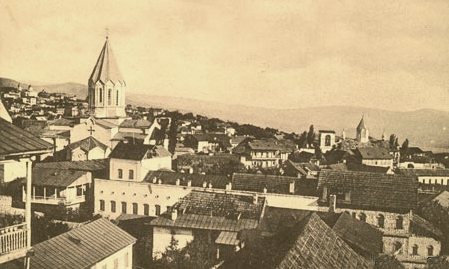
A general view of Shusha and the cathedral, early 20th century.

According to historical records, a small basilica church stood on the present premises as early as 1722. In the 19th century, following the conquest of the Caucasus by the Russian Empire, Shusha was one of the largest cities in the South Caucasus region, being larger and more prosperous than either Baku or Yerevan, the current capitals of Azerbaijan and Armenia, respectively. Alongside Tiflis, the city was a major center for Armenian cultural activity in the region. According to Russian imperial sources, in 1886 the city had a mixed Armenian (57%) and Tatar (later known as Azerbaijani; 43%) population of almost 27,000. The oldest section of the current cathedral, the bell tower, was built in 1858, and was financed by the Khandamiriants family.

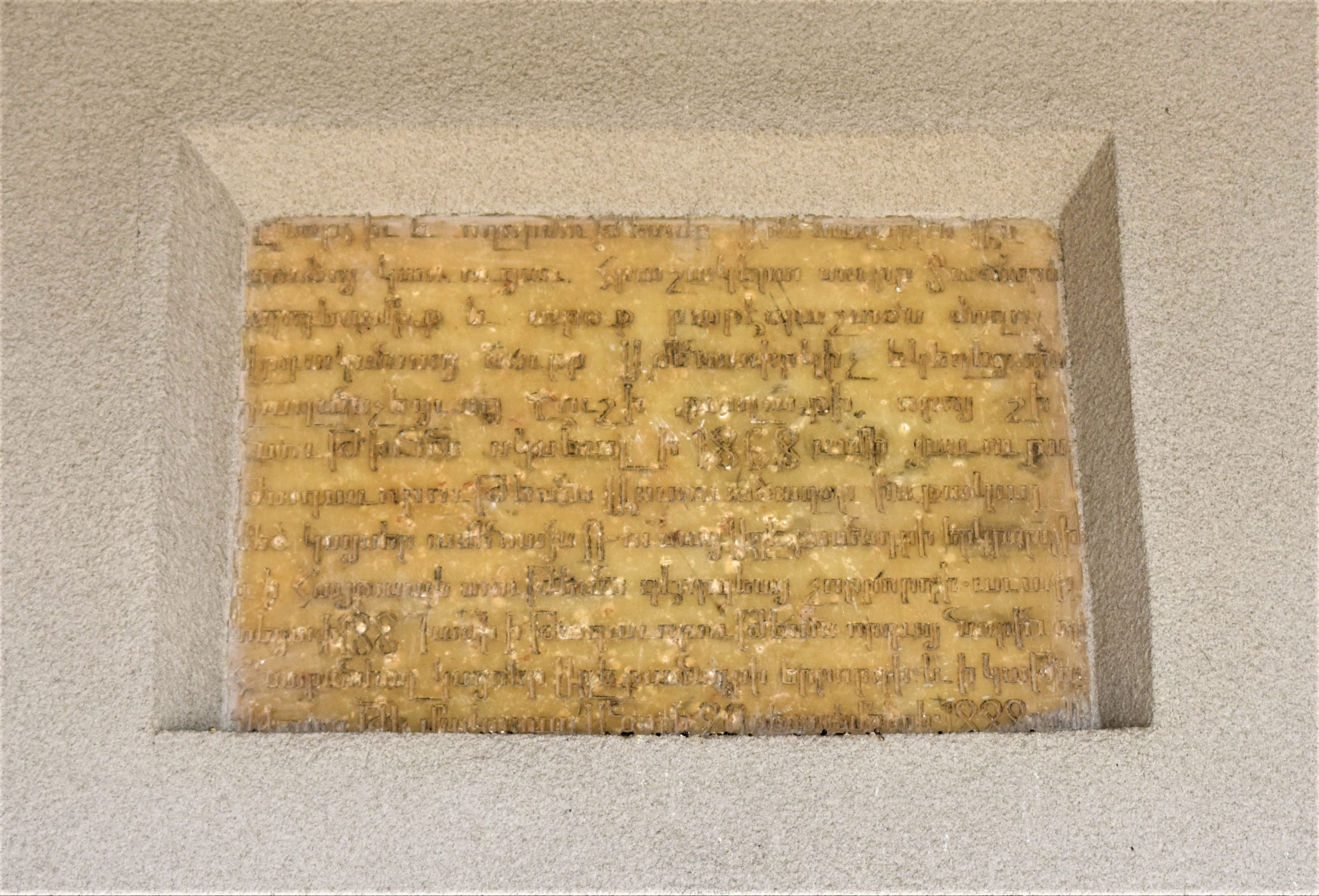
The foundation inscription.

The construction of the church began in 1868 and was completed in 1887. Its name comes from Ghazanchi (present-day Qazançı), a village in Nakhchivan, where the Khandamiriants family originated. Furthermore, the quarter where the church is located was also known by that name (Ղազանչեցոց թաղ, Ghazanchetsots t′agh) as it was populated by the descendants of migrants from Ghazanchi. The church was designed by Simon Ter-Hakobian(ts). The church was consecrated on 20 September 1888 according to an inscription on the upper part of the southern portal. The inscription reads:

By the blessing and grace of almighty God this miraculous sacred cathedral is built at the expense and with the donations of the parish of the church of Amenaprkich Ghazanchetsots of the city of Shushi, the construction [was begun] in 1868 at the reign of the all-powerful emperor of all Russia Alexander II and the patriarchate of Gevorg IV and was completed in 1887 at the time of the coronation of the son of His Majesty the blessed emperor Alexander III and Catholicos Markar I, on 20 September 1888.

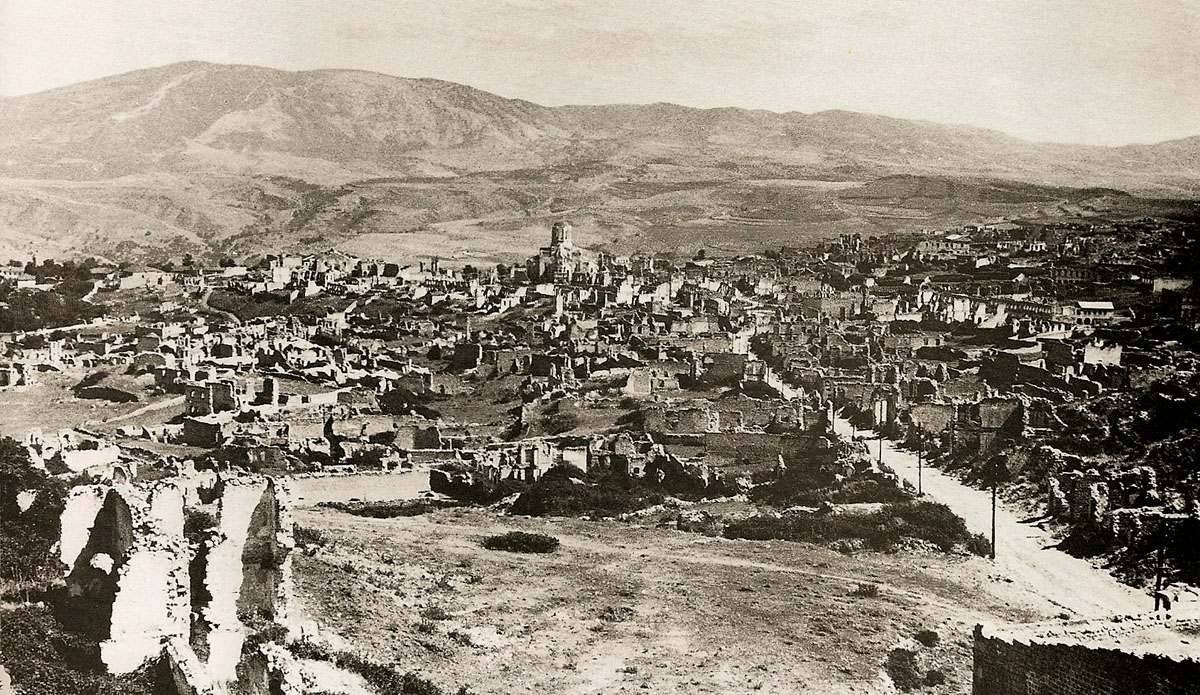
Ruins of Shushi and the damaged cathedral (in the background, in the center) in the aftermath of the 1920 massacre.

== 1920 massacre and decline ==
The majority of the Armenian population of Shusha was massacred or expelled in March 1920. The cathedral was damaged and gradually declined. After the region came under Soviet control because of state atheist policies, it was eventually closed down in 1930 and was turned into a granary in the 1940s. Its dome and part of the walls surrounding it were destroyed in the 1950s. It was then looted, and its stones were used to build several upscale houses in the Azerbaijani part of the city. By the 1970s the cathedral "looked like it [had] survived heavy shelling." After public pressure, Soviet and Azerbaijani authorities granted permission for the launch of a restoration project of the cathedral in the 1980s. The restoration began in 1981 and continued until 1988 and was supervised by Volodya Babayan. By 1987 only two of the four stone statues of angels on the bell tower had survived.

== First Karabakh War ==
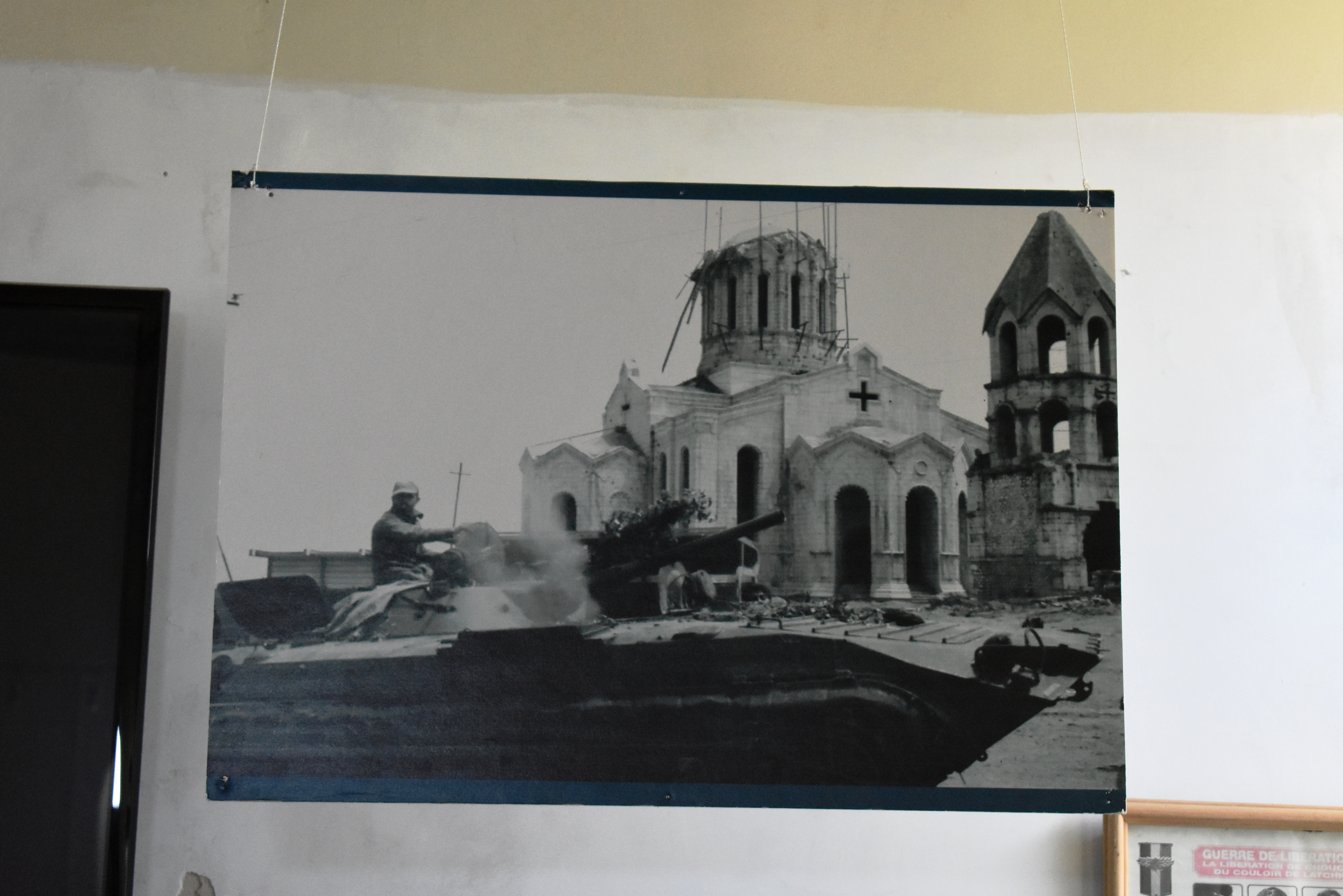
A photo of the cathedral with an Armenian armored personnel carrier in the foreground, May 1992.

Shusha's Armenian minority was expelled from the city after the Nagorno-Karabakh conflict began in February 1988. The cathedral was turned into an armory by Azerbaijan. According to Armenian political analyst Levon Melik-Shahnazaryan, the cathedral was set on fire three times between 1988 and 1991 using car tires. Azerbaijanis dismantled the stone statues of angels on the bell tower in 1989. They reportedly sold off its bronze bell, which was later found in a market in Donetsk, Ukraine and was bought by an Armenian officer for three million rubles and returned to Armenia. Prior to the fall of Shushi to the Armenians, Azerbaijani forces stored hundreds of boxes of BM-21 Grad missiles as the cathedral was safe from potential Armenian bombardment. Shusha was used as a base for the shelling of Stepanakert, the largest city of Karabakh, with Grad launchers for several months. Armenian volunteers, including noted activist Igor Muradyan, carried the wooden boxes of artillery and rocket shells out of the church immediately after the capture of the city. The flag of Armenia was raised on top of the damaged dome by Armenian troops. Melik-Shahnazaryan wrote that by the time of its capture "practically, only a stone skeleton had remained of the magnificent structure." A foreign visitor noted that its "windows were missing, but the interior was in reasonable condition."

On 23 August 1992, Azerbaijani bombers launched attacks against the church. However, no serious casualties were reported. Felix Corley suggested that the attempt was not of any military importance and "appeared to be a deliberate attempt to attack the Armenian heritage in Karabakh."

== Restoration and revival ==
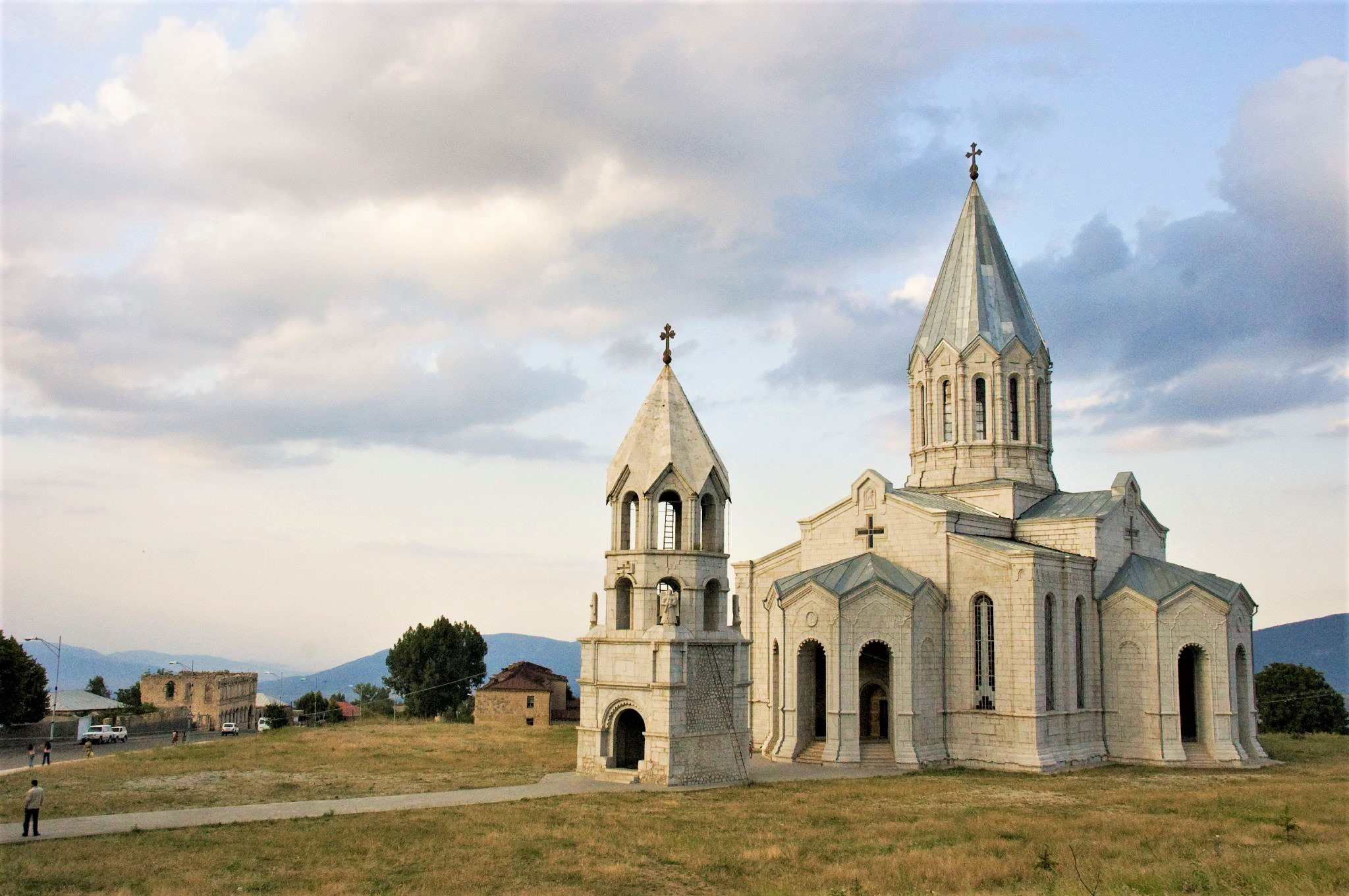
The cathedral as seen in 2007 before the cleanup of the surrounding area.

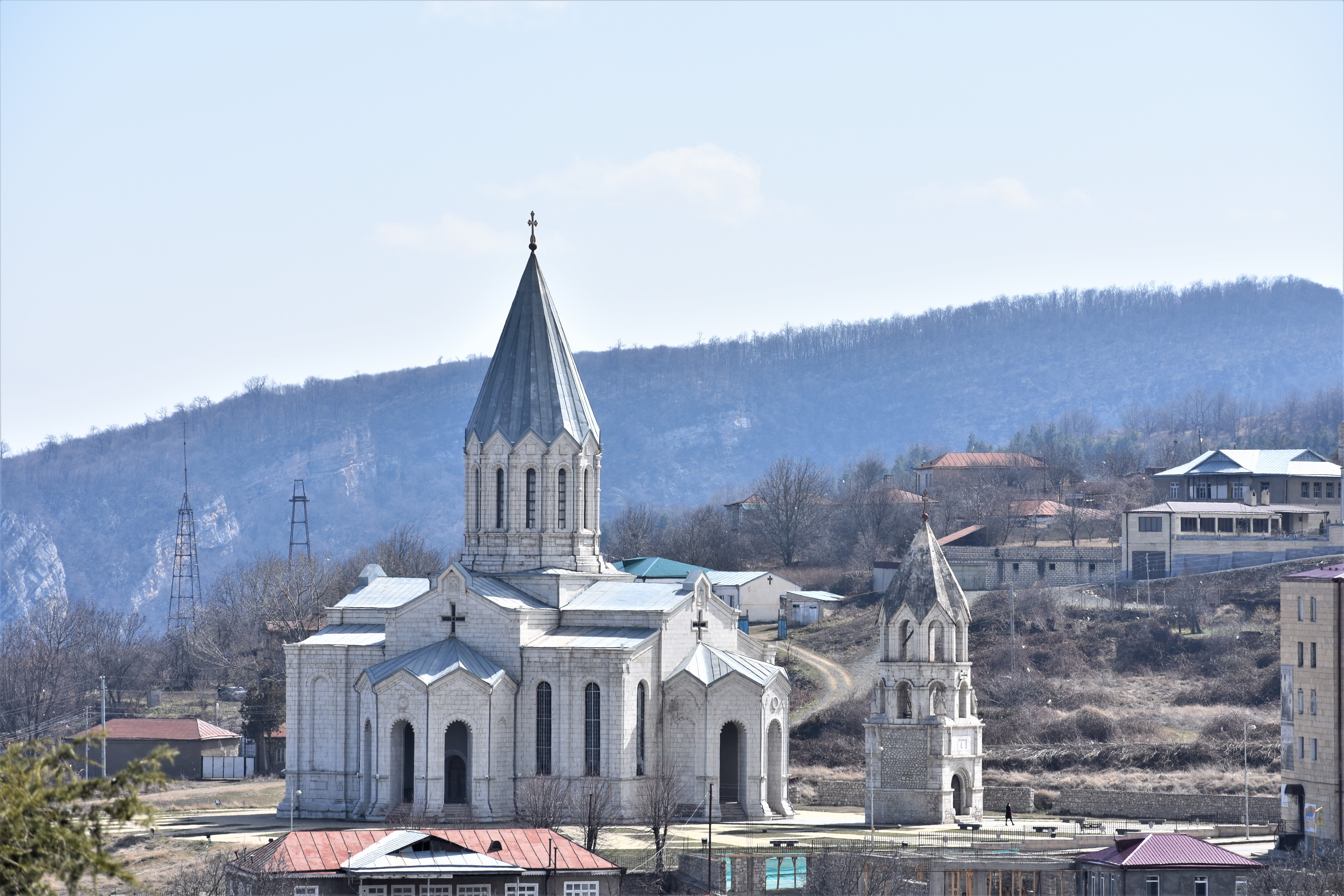
A view from Kanach Zham, 2018.

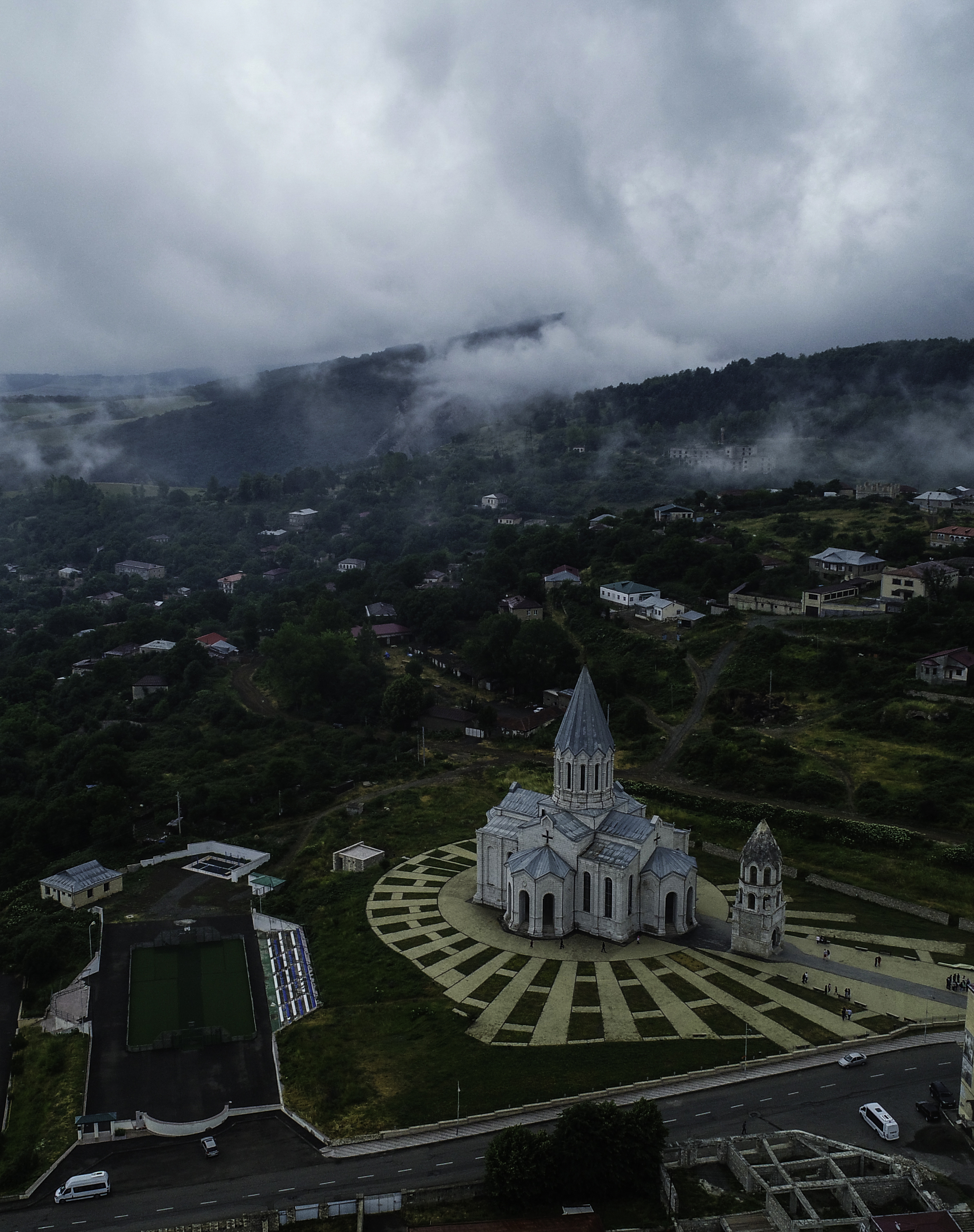
An aerial view in 2019

Restoration of the cathedral began soon after its capture by Armenian forces. As of 1997, it was reportedly the only building being restored in Shushi. Restoration works were conducted by Volodya Babayan and primarily funded by Andreas Roubian, an Armenian evangelical benefactor from New Jersey, who provided $110,000. Tens of thousands of dollars came from various Armenian diaspora communities and wealthy individuals. Cleanup and furnishing were completed in May 1998. The cathedral was reconsecrated on 18 June 1998 on the Feast of the Transfiguration by Archbishop Pargev Martirosyan, the Primate of the Diocese of Artsakh. The first Divine Liturgy at the restored cathedral took place on July 19 with the attendance of Nagorno-Karabakh President Arkadi Ghukasyan and officials from Armenia. Archbishop Sebouh Chouldjian read a letter from Catholicos Karekin I, who did not attend due to health problems.

Yulia Antonyan suggested that its reconstruction was "perceived more as a cultural process aimed at a restoration of the Armenian cultural heritage, a spiritual and physical 'rebirth' of the Armenian nation" and came to symbolize the rebirth of Shushi. It now "towers, immaculate once more, above the ruined town," wrote de Waal in his 2003 book Black Garden. Daniel Bardsley wrote in 2009 that the cathedral is now "one of the few pristine-looking buildings in the city."

On 16 October 2008, a mass wedding, sponsored by Levon Hayrapetyan, a Russian-based businessman from Karabakh, took place in Nagorno-Karabakh. Around 700 couples got married on that day, 500 of whom married at Ghazanchetsots and 200 at Gandzasar monastery.

On 14 April 2016, Catholicos of All Armenians Karekin II and Catholicos of The Holy See of Cilicia Aram I delivered a prayer for peace and for the safety of Nagorno-Karabakh. It came days after clashes between Armenian and Azerbaijani forces, which were the deadliest since the ceasefire of 1994, until the 2020 Nagorno-Karabakh conflict.

On 6 April 2017, Serj Tankian, the lead singer of the rock band System of a Down performed the Christian liturgical prayer "Lord, have mercy" (Armenian: Տէր, ողորմեա, Ter voghormia), in Armenian, at the cathedral.

== 2020 shelling ==
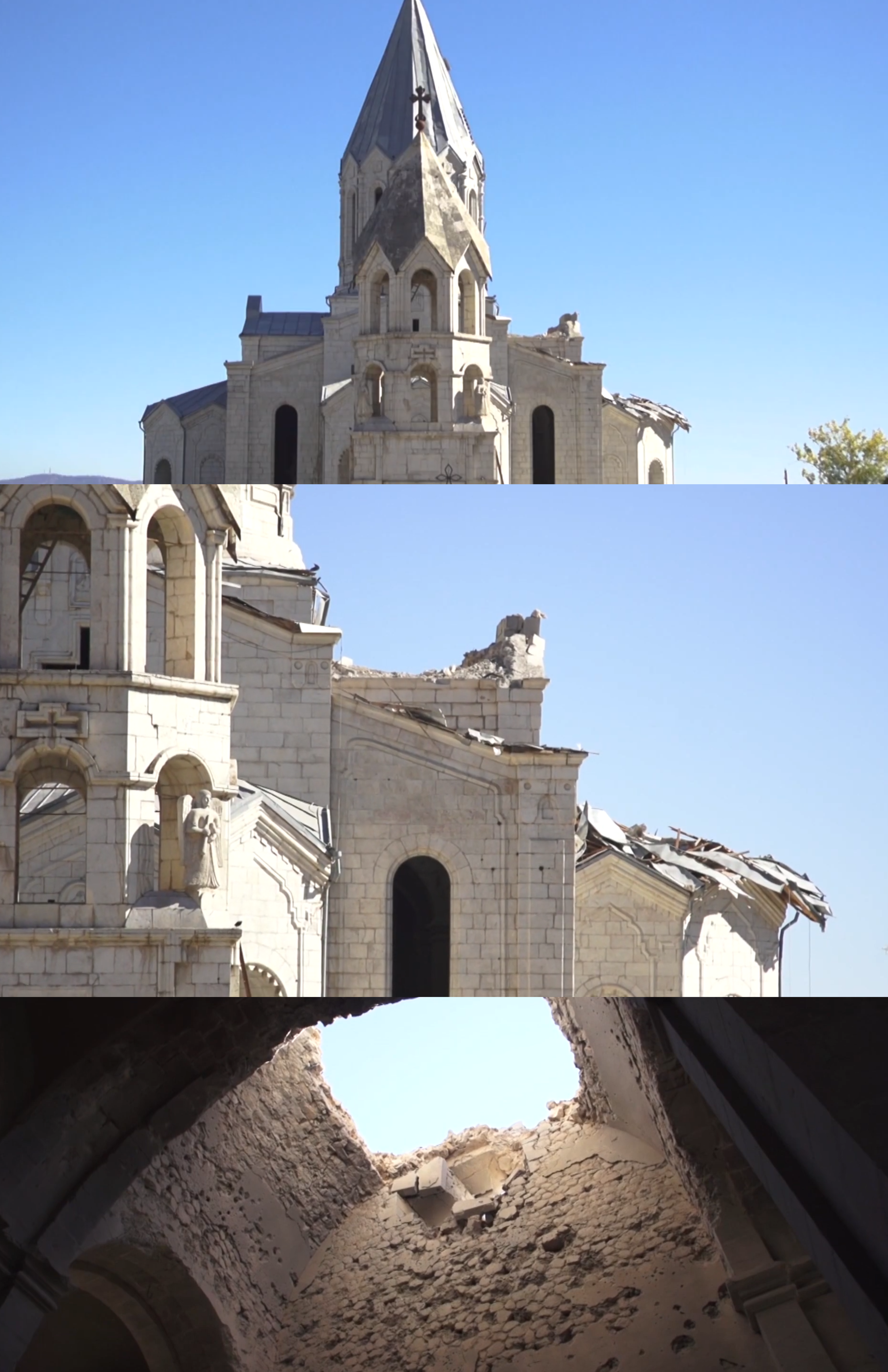
The cathedral was bombed twice on 8 October 2020 by Azerbaijani armed forces during Nagorno-Karabakh conflict.

On 8 October 2020, the cathedral was struck twice by Azerbaijan, which resulted in the collapse of part of the roof. A Russian journalist was seriously injured by the second strike, while two others were wounded. Human Rights Watch (HRW) noted that the two attacks "suggest that the church, a civilian object with cultural significance, was an intentional target despite the absence of evidence that it was used for military purposes." HRW collected remnants of the weapon used against the church, which "corroborate the use of guided munitions." An investigation by Hetq concluded that the church was hit with 300 mm rockets, probably that of a Turkish-made TRG-300 Kasirga multiple rocket launcher.

Between the shelling of the church and the capture of the town by Azerbaijan, the church continued to attract Armenians. On October 12 cellist Sevak Avanesyan played Krunuk (The Crane) by Komitas inside the partially ruined church. On October 24 a couple from Martuni got married at the church. On November 6, 2020 Archbishop Bagrat Galstanyan of Tavush delivered a prayer at the church.

Armenian reactions

Armenia's Foreign Ministry issued an official statement describing it as "another crime of the military-political leadership of Azerbaijan... this action fully fits into its policy of Armenophobia developed for decades. Azerbaijan, which has completely annihilated the Armenian cultural heritage in Nakhchivan and in other parts of the historical homeland of the Armenian people, now throughout the ongoing military aggression against Artsakh is trying to deprive Armenians of Artsakh of their homeland and historical memory."

The Armenian Apostolic Church condemned the attack and described it as "an outgrowth of extreme religious intolerance." Armenia's first foreign minister Raffi Hovannisian wrote in the New York Post that it took back "even the most modern-minded" Armenians to 1915, referring to the Armenian genocide.

Azerbaijani reactions

Azerbaijan's Defense Ministry officially denied it was behind the attack, while its state news agency claimed the missiles came from the Armenian side. Azerbaijan's President Ilham Aliyev later stated: "We need to investigate this issue... We have doubts that could have been done by Armenians in order to blame us. If it was done by Azerbaijani military units, that was a mistake, and we don’t have any historical or religious targets..." In an interview with BBC, Aliyev stated: "the images of that church which I have seen, show that it is very minor damage. And this damage can be repaired within maximum two weeks." Almost two years after the war, Aliyev's advisor Hikmet Hajiyev said that the church "sustained collateral damage" during the war.

International reactions

The US Commission on International Religious Freedom (USCIRF) stated that they were "dismayed to learn that the Ghazanchetsots Cathedral was seriously damaged by fighting in Nagorno-Karabakh" and called for the safeguarding of places of worship and religious sites, particularly during the violent conflict. The attack was condemned by US Representative Frank Pallone and German MP Albert Weiler, among others.

A statement released by the International Association of Genocide Scholars (IAGS), signed by Israel Charny, Yair Auron, Matthias Bjørnlund, Tessa Hofmann and others argued that the strikes on the church are "a part of policy of the cultural genocide that the Azerbaijani government has been implementing over the past 30 years by systematically destroying the Armenian historical heritage."

In December 2020 Human Rights Watch's Europe and Central Asia director Hugh Williamson called on Azerbaijan to investigate the attacks. "It has been over a month since Azerbaijan has retaken control of Shushi and the government needs to waste no time in investigating the attacks and holding those responsible to account. Attacks such as these serve no military purpose and all parties should ensure these kinds of attacks are punished and otherwise prevented," he said.

== Under Azerbaijani control ==
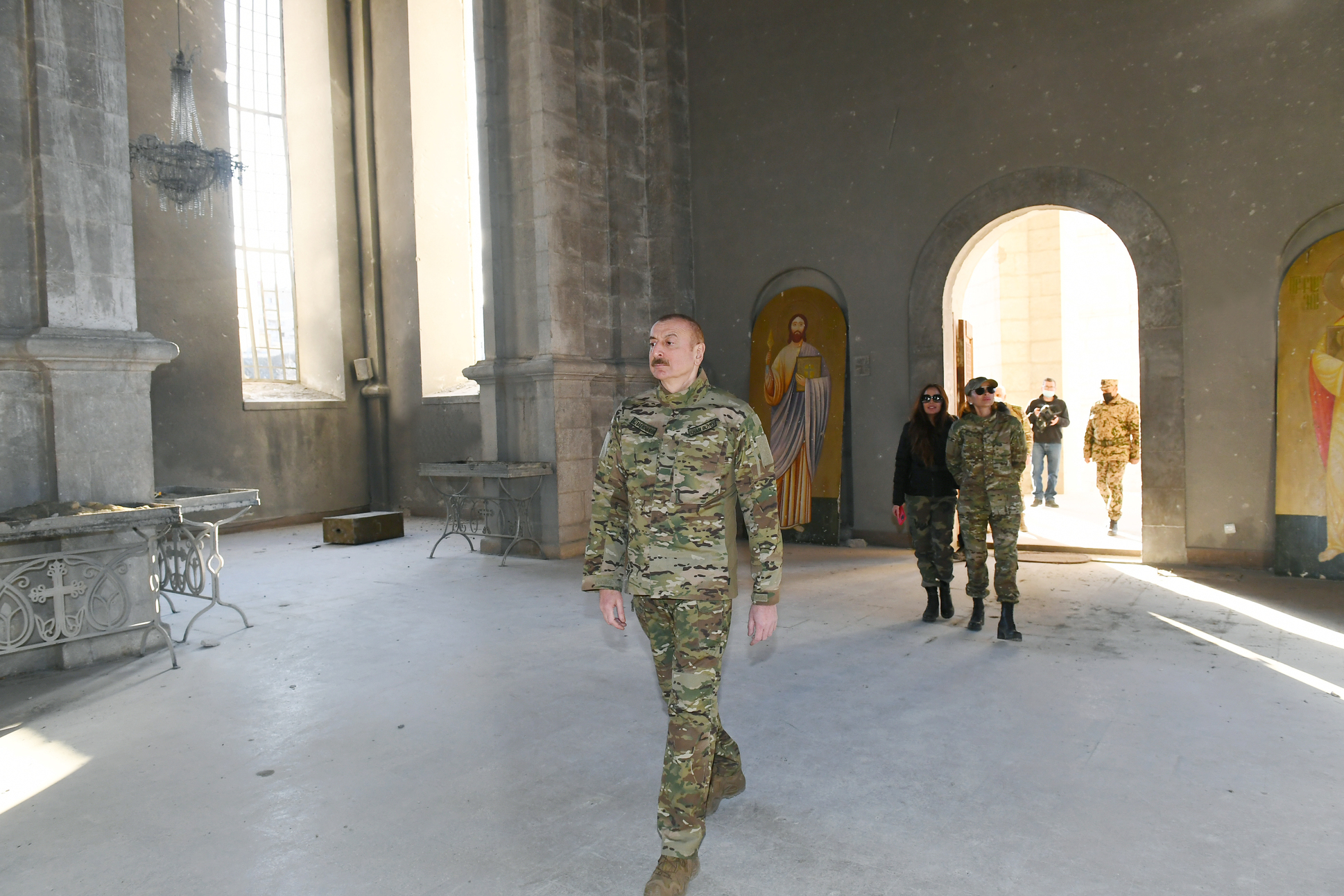
Azerbaijani president Ilham Aliyev inside the church in January 2021

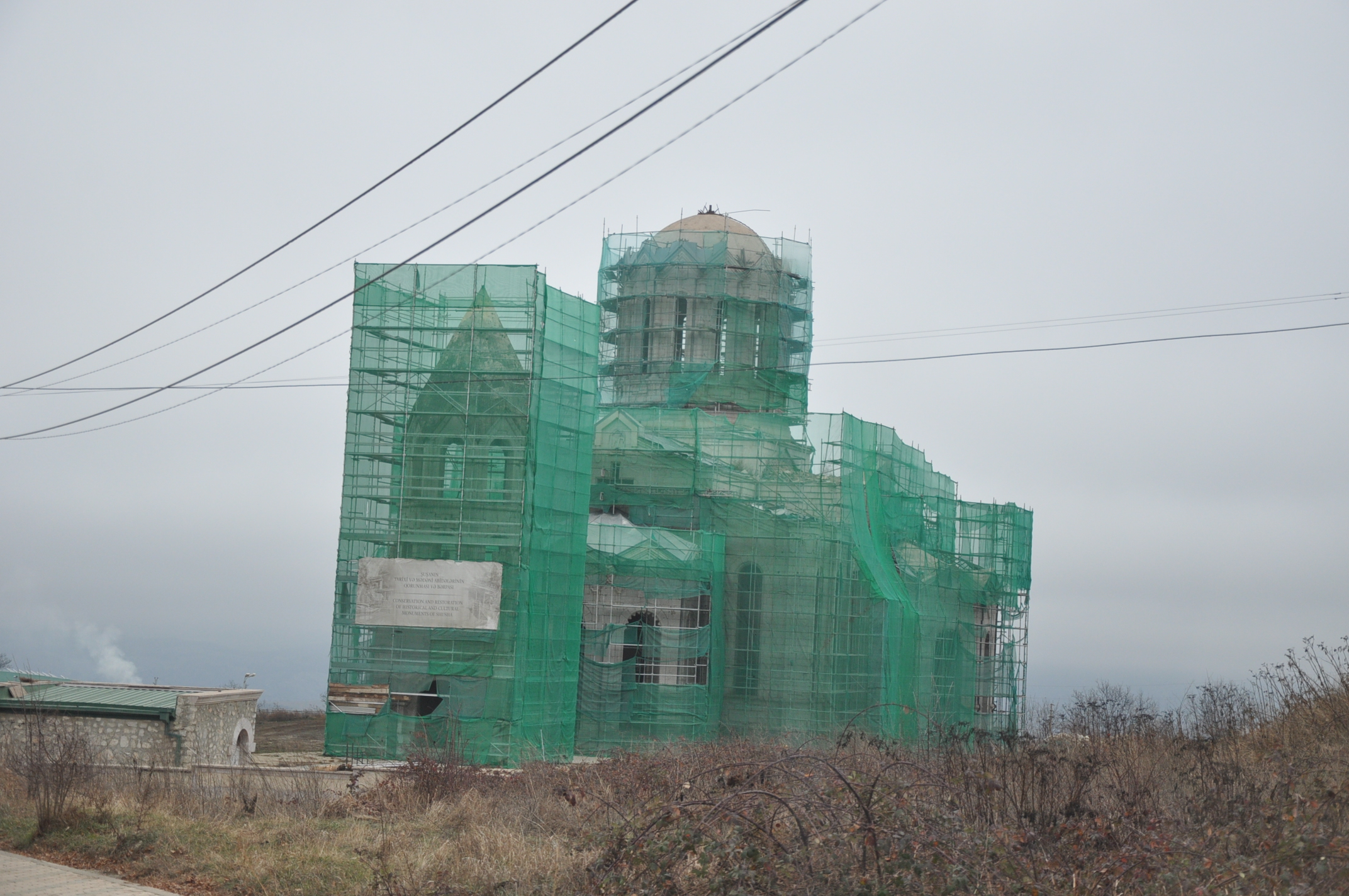
The church in December 2021

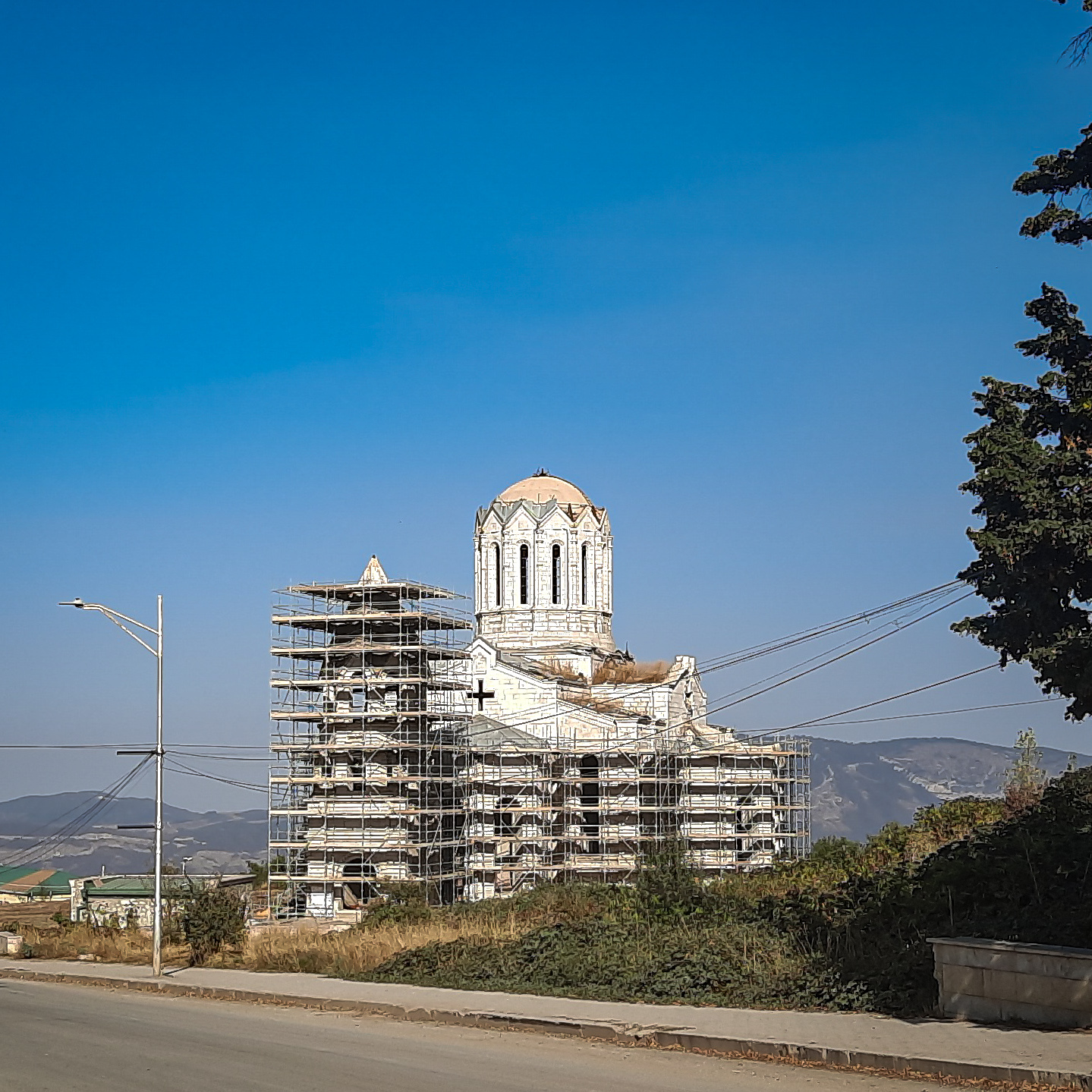
The church in September 2022

The town of Shusha was captured by Azerbaijani forces by November 9, 2020, when a trilateral armistice agreement was reached between Armenia, Azerbaijan and Russia. On November 14, a photo emerged online showing graffiti on the cathedral's wall. Armenia's Ministry of Culture released a statement claiming that there was already evidence of vandalism against the cathedral. The Armenian Church described the vandalism as desecration and strongly condemned it as an "expression of obvious vandalism and intolerance."

After the war, the Azerbaijani government announced a renovation of the cathedral in the frame of large-scale reconstruction work in Shusha. The renovation project attracted much attention and criticism, with many Armenians alleging that Azerbaijan was seeking to blot out the Armenian identity of the church by altering or obscuring its basic features and design elements. In May 2021, footage released by CivilNet showed the conical dome of the church had been removed and the church itself surrounded by ostensible scaffolding. A report by Caucasian Knot quoted several Azerbaijani state officials who claimed that the renovation project aimed to restore the "original" appearance of the church, which, according to them, lacked the conical dome until it was added by the Armenians following Shushi's capture in 1992. However, the conical dome of the church can be seen in photographs from over a century ago.

The United States Commission on International Religious Freedom and International Christian Concern expressed concern with the announced renovation.

In June 2023 Azerbaijani Ambassador to the Holy See Ilgar Mukhtarov stated that the church, "misappropriated by Armenians, is currently regaining its original appearance." Ambassador Nasimi Aghayev spoke of a "pre-occupation appearance". At a media forum in Shusha in July 2023, Aliyev stated: "We do not touch the historical heritage of the Armenian people. There is even an Armenian church here in Shusha. Anyone can go and have a look, not a single stone has been touched there. On the contrary, it is protected."

In 2026 buildings arose on the grounds of the cathedral, encircling it and "encroaching on a sacred landscape," according to a report by Caucasus Heritage Watch.

== Architecture ==
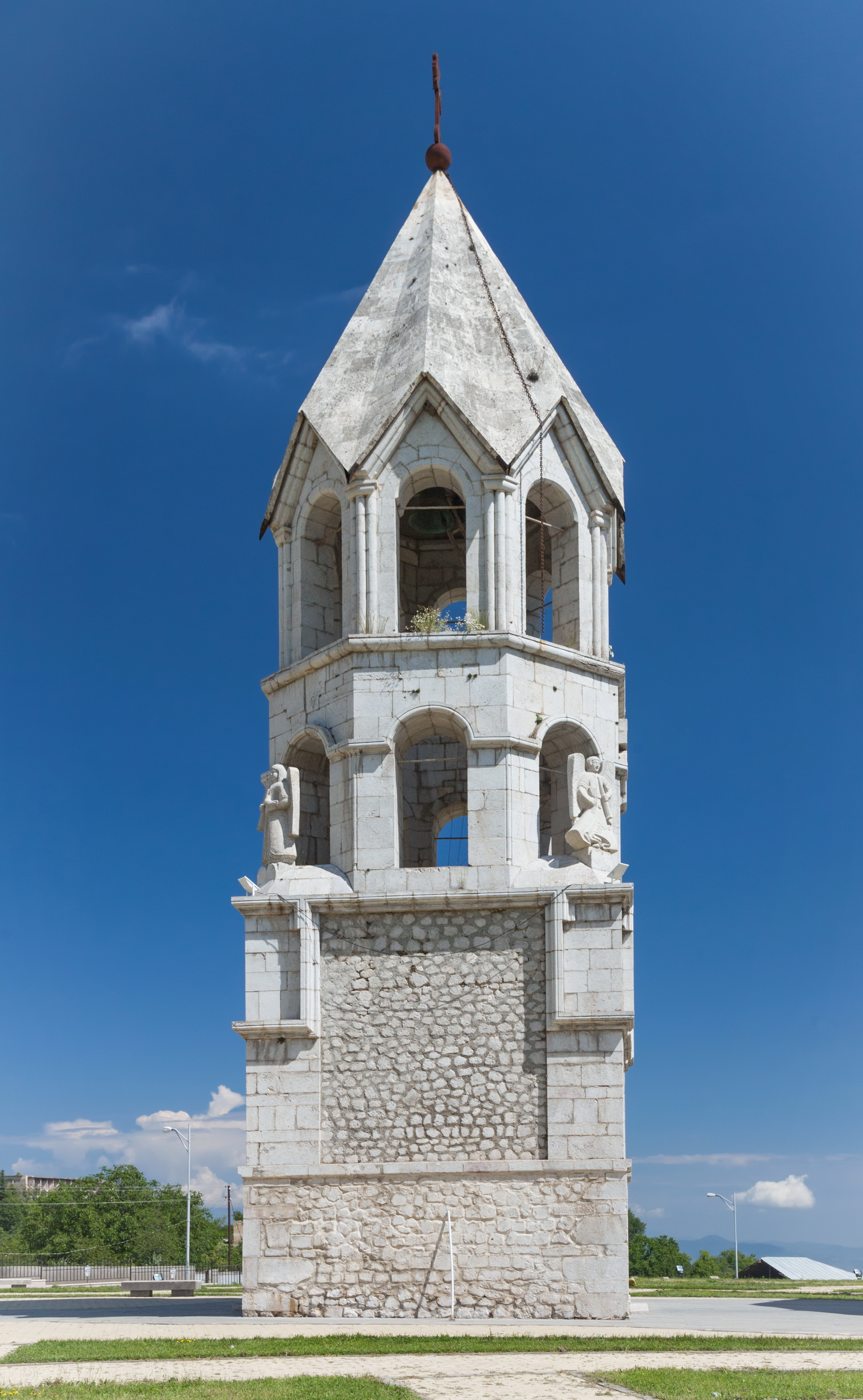
The bell tower.

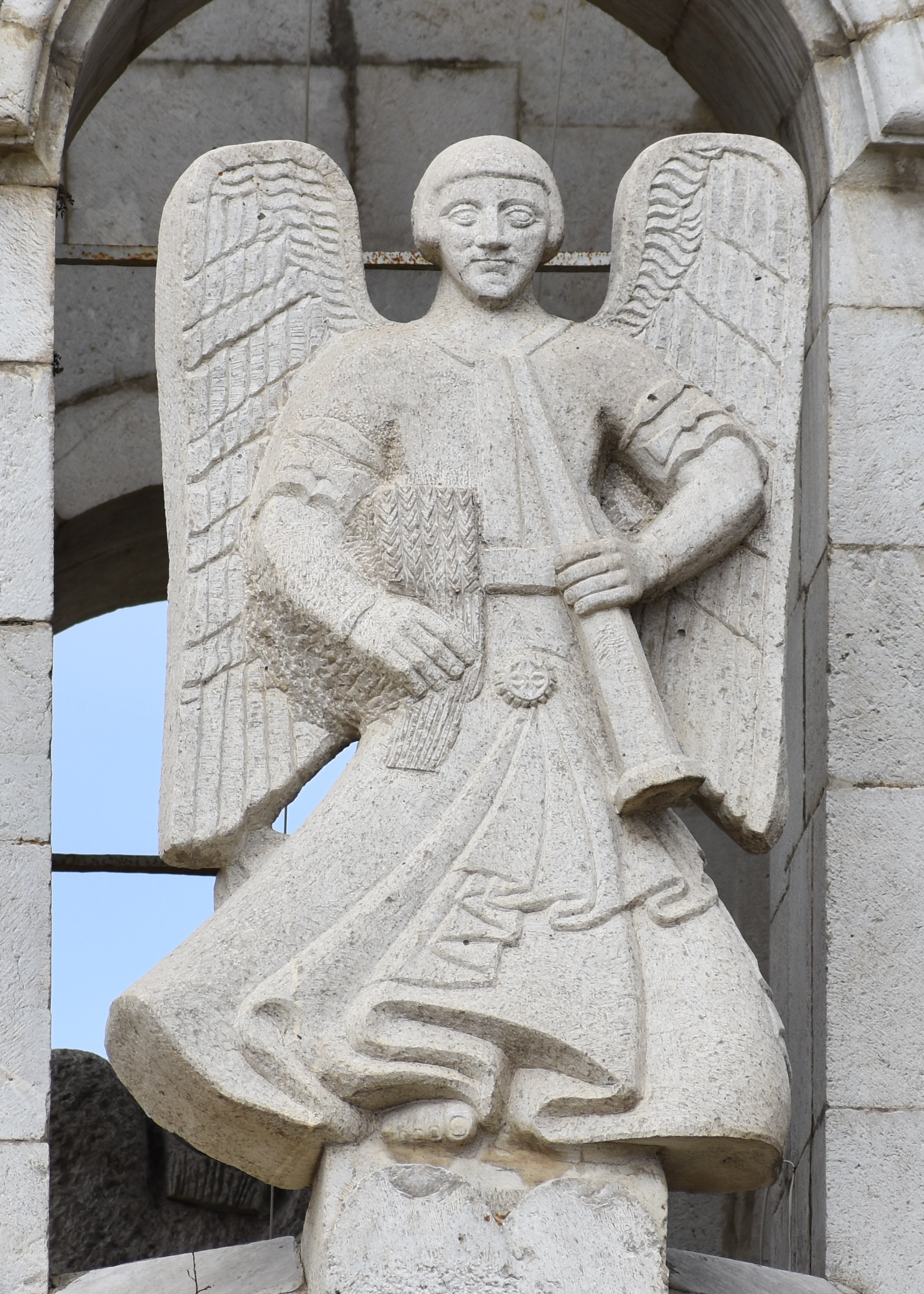
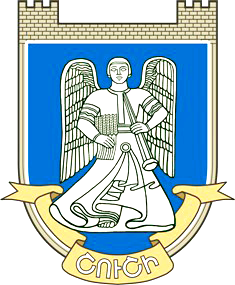
The sculpture of an angel on the bell tower of the cathedral (left) is depicted on the coat of arms of Shushi used during Armenian administration of Shusha (right).

The cathedral's church is a domed basilica with four apsides. It is 34.7 m (114 ft) long and 23 m (75 ft) wide. (Note: Alternatively given as 35 by 23 metres (115 by 75 ft).) Standing at a height of 35 m (115 ft), it is one of the largest Armenian churches. Its dome, with a metal conical roof, was 17 m (56 ft) tall before heavy alteration in 2021. Architect Artak Ghulyan criticized the proportions of the roof, restored by Volodya Babayan, as being unfaithful (too tall) to the original proportions. The church has three identical entrances from the west, south and north. There are ornamental reliefs on the portals and windows. The church's floor plan is an imitation of that of Etchmiadzin Cathedral, Armenia's mother church. The cathedral is seen as having combined both innovative techniques and well-established traditions of Armenian architecture.

Both the church and the bell tower are built of white limestone. The freestanding bell tower has three floors (levels) and contains two bells, the larger of which was cast in Tula, Russia in 1857. Four sculptures of angels blowing trumpets stand on the top of its first floor.

== Significance ==
The cathedral, along with Gandzasar monastery, is a symbol of history and identity for the Armenians of Artsakh/Karabakh. Novelist Zori Balayan noted that it was often referenced during the emergence of the Karabakh Movement. It has become a symbol of the liberation of the city as perceived by Armenians and a popular pilgrimage site for Armenians from Armenia and the diaspora. Catholicos Karekin II called the cathedral a symbol of the Armenian liberation movement of Artsakh during a mass at the cathedral in 2016. Furthermore, it is seen as a remnant of the 19th and early 20th century religious-cultural renaissance of the city.

Numerous manuscripts used to be kept at the cathedral, the earliest dated 1612. The Right Arm of Grigoris, the grandson of Gregory the Illuminator, was also kept at the cathedral.

== Heritage designation ==
The cathedral is included in the list of cultural and historical monuments of the breakaway Republic of Artsakh and the list of cultural and historical monuments of the Republic of Azerbaijan. In 2001, the Shusha State Historical and Architectural Reserve, which includes Ghazanchetsots Cathedral, was added to the Tentative List of UNESCO World Heritage Sites from Azerbaijan.

== Bibliography ==
- Corley, Felix (1998). "The Armenian Church under the Soviet and independent regimes, part 3: The leadership of Vazgen". Religion, State and Society. 26 (3–4): 291–355. doi:10.1080/09637499808431832.
- de Waal, Thomas (2003). Black Garden: Armenia and Azerbaijan Through Peace and War. New York: New York University Press. ISBN 978-0-8147-1945-9.
- Vardanyan, Mariam (1998). "Օծվեց Շուշիի Սուրբ Ամենափրկիչ Ղազանչեցոց եկեղեցին [Consecration of the Ghazanchetsots Holy Savior Cathedral of Shushi]". Etchmiadzin (in Armenian). 54 (7): 113–120.
- Hasratyan, Murad (2002). "Շուշիի Ղազանչեցոց Ս. Ամենափրկիչ Եկեղեցի [Ghazanchetsots S. All-Savior Church of Shushi]". In Ayvazyan, Hovhannes (ed.). "Քրիստոնյա Հայաստան" հանրագիտարան ["Christian Armenia" Encyclopedia] (in Armenian). Yerevan: Armenian Encyclopedia Publishing.view online
- Hasratyan, Murad (1982). "Շուշի. Ճարտարապետությունը [Shushi: Architecture]". Soviet Armenian Encyclopedia Volume (in Armenian). Yerevan. p. 601.
- Mkrtchyan, Shahen [in Armenian] (1988). "Церковь Казанчецоц [Ghazanchetsots Church]". Историко-архитектурные памятники Нагорного Карабаха [Historical and architectural monuments of Nagorno-Karabakh]. Yerevan: Hayastan Publishing. pp. 183–184.
- Mkrtchian, Shahen [in Armenian]; Davtian, Schors (1999). "The Church of Ghazanchetsots". In Oskanian, Vartan (ed.). Shushi: The City of Tragic Fate. Yerevan: Amaras Publishing House. ISBN 9789993010050. Archived from the original on 1 January 2018.
