= Pargev Martirosyan =

Armenian clergyman (born 1954)

Archbishop Pargev Martirosyan
- Bishop of Artsakh
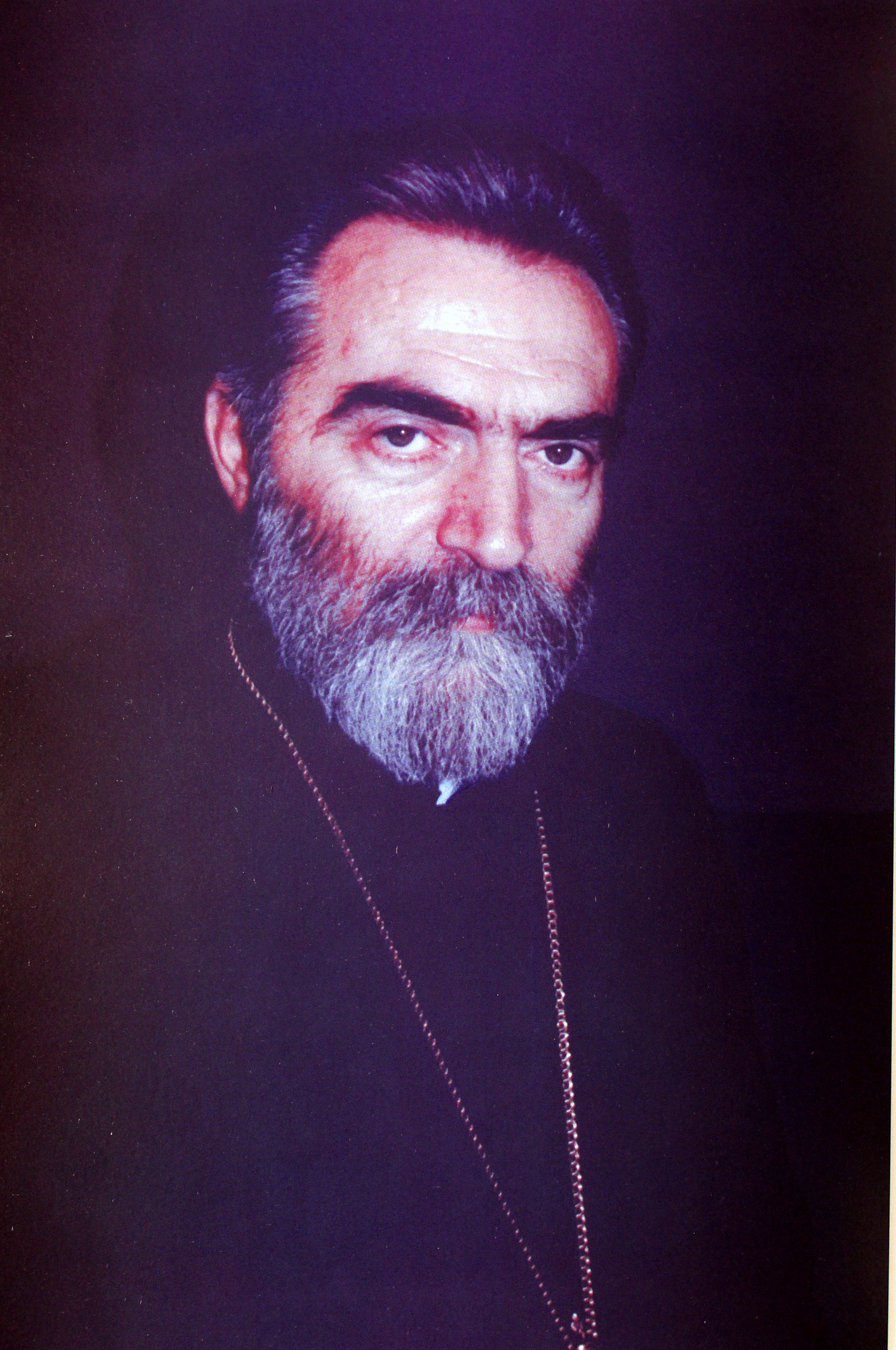
- Martirosyan in 2013
- Native name: Պարգև արքեպիսկոպոս Մարտիրոսյան
- Church: Armenian Apostolic Church
- Diocese: Artsakh
- Appointed: 1989
- Retired: 21 January 2021
- Predecessor: Inaugural bishop
- Successor: Vrtanes Abrahamyan

Orders
- Ordination: 1985
- Consecration: 1988 by Vazgen I

Personal details
- Born: Gurgen Martirosyan; 20 March 1954 (age 72) Sumqayit, Azerbaijan SSR

Archbishop Pargev Martirosyan (Armenian: Պարգև արքեպիսկոպոս Մարտիրոսյան; born 20 March 1954) is an Armenian clergyman who served as the Primate of the Diocese of Artsakh of the Armenian Apostolic Church from the re-establishment of the diocese in 1989 until 2021. He retired from his post in January 2021 and was appointed Pontifical envoy-at-large by Karekin II, Catholicos of All Armenians.

== Early life and education ==
Martirosyan was born Gurgen Martirosyan in the Soviet Azerbaijani city of Sumqayit in 1954 to an Armenian family from Chardakhly village. His family moved to Yerevan in 1966. In 1976 he graduated from the Yerevan Institute of Foreign Languages. Martirosyan later worked in Yeghegnut village school as a Russian language teacher, after which he was drafted to the Soviet army. From 1978 to 1980, he worked at the Ministry of Industry. In 1980 Martirosyan was admitted to the Gevorkian Theological Seminary in Ejmiatsin. He was ordained as a deacon in 1983. He finished the seminary in 1984 and continued his education at the Leningrad Theological Academy until 1986.

Caroline Cox, Baroness Cox described him as "a man of considerable intellect, substance, humanity, as well as a man of faith".

== Religious career ==
In 1985 he was ordained as a celibate priest and named Pargev. In April 1987 he was named vardapet (archimandrite). He taught at the Gevorkian Theological Seminary. In 1987 he earned his doctoral degree in theology from the Leningrad Theological Academy. The same year he started serving at the Saint Hripsime Church. In November 1988 he was consecrated as bishop by Catholicos Vazgen I. In March 1989, he was appointed the primate of the newly created Diocese of Artsakh. In 1999 he was given the title of archbishop by Karekin I.

== First Karabakh War ==
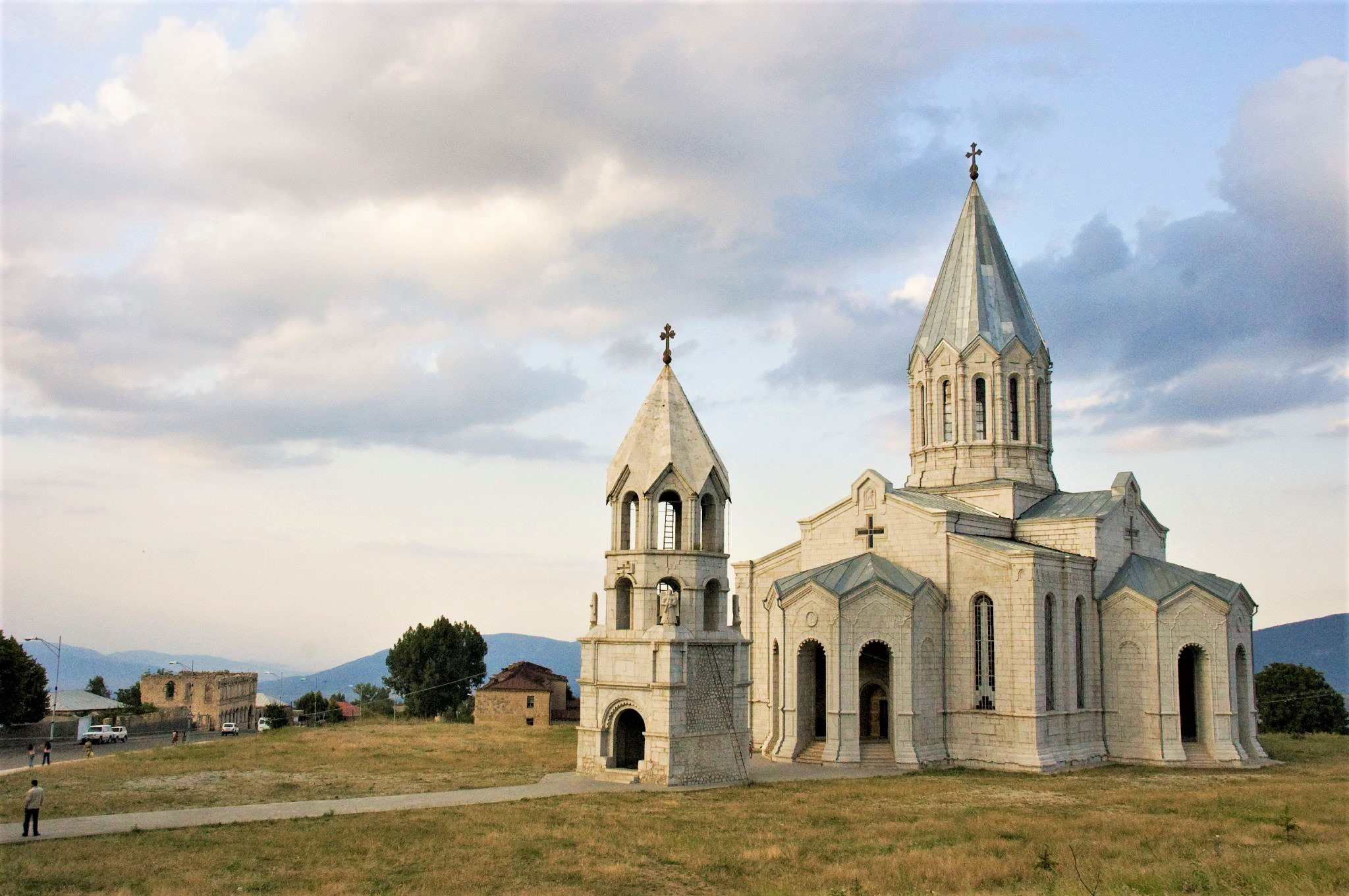
Ghazanchetsots Cathedral

Pargev Martirosyan was in Karabakh throughout the war with Azerbaijan, which ended in 1994. The Armenian forces marked their first major victory on 8–9 May 1992, when they took over Shusha, the historic center of the region. Archbishop Pargev blessed the Armenian soldiers before the start of the operation. On the morning of 9 May 1992 Archbishop Pargev with a number of Armenians soldiers entered the Ghazanchetsots Cathedral in Shusha, where they prayed for the fallen soldiers. It was the first time since the 1920 Shusha massacre that a prayer was heard at the cathedral. Soon after the city was captured, restoration work began at Ghazanchetsots, which was used as an arsenal by the Azerbaijanis.

== Second Karabakh War ==
When the 2020 Nagorno-Karabakh War between Armenia and Azerbaijan began, Martirosyan made a public statement to the Armenian people, calling for strength and unity in the face of the war. During the hostilities, Ghazanchetsots Cathedral, the seat of Martirosyan's diocese, was shelled by Azerbaijani forces. The cathedral was struck twice by missiles in one hour, wounding two Russian journalists and significantly damaging the cathedral's roof. Martirosyan compared the shelling to actions of the Islamic State and held a prayer in the damaged cathedral days later.

== Health problems and retirement ==
Martirosyan suffered a heart attack in November 2020 and was transported to the United States for treatment. He recovered and returned to Armenia in December that year.

On 21 January 2021, it was announced that Archbishop Pargev was retiring from the post of Primate of the Diocese of Artsakh, and instead would serve as Catholicos Karekin II's pontifical envoy-at-large. He was succeeded by Bishop Vrtanes Abrahamyan, who previously held the post of spiritual leader of the Armed Forces of Armenia. Archbishop Pargev stated in an interview that his retirement was due to his poor health.

== Works and activities ==
Archbishop Pargev Martirosyan has authored three books and a number of articles and essays.

He holds a 1st dan-ranked black belt in shotokan karate. He is the honorary president of the Shotokan Karate Federation of Armenia. In 2014 he was awarded the title "Hero of Artsakh", the highest honorary title of the Republic of Artsakh.
