= Jalil Safarov =

- Born: January 28, 1962; Marneuli Municipality, Georgia
- Died: May 15, 1992 (aged 30); Turshsu, Shusha, Azerbaijan
- Military career
- Conflicts: First Nagorno-Karabakh War
- Awards: National Hero of Azerbaijan; 1992

Jalil Safarov (Azerbaijani: Cəfərov Cəlil Əziz oğlu) (January 28, 1962, Marneuli Municipality, Georgia – May 15, 1992, Turshsu, Shusha, Azerbaijan) was awarded the honorary title of "National Hero of Azerbaijan" for his actions in the Karabakh war.

== Life ==
Safarov was born on January 28, 1962, in the Lejbaddin village of Marneuli Municipality, Georgia. His family moved to Sumgayit District of Azerbaijan. He attended school in Sumgayit. He was admitted to Jamshid Nakhchivanski Military Lyceum in 1977. After completing his education in 1980, he entered Vladikavkaz Military Racquet & Zenith Command School. He worked in Priozorsk and Balhash cities of Kazakhstan since 1984 and returned to Azerbaijan eight years later.

== Military activities ==
Safarov arrived in Karabakh by the appointment of the Defense Ministry and remained here after finishing his service. He participated in the battles around Shusha District against the Armenian Army. On May 15, 1992, Safarov was killed in the battle in the direction of Turshsu-Zardisli village of Shusha.

== Memorial ==
By the Decree of the President of the Republic of Azerbaijan No. 831 dated 6 June 1992, Jalil Safarov was posthumously awarded the honorary title of "National Hero of Azerbaijan". He was buried in the Martyrs' Lane in Baku. School No. 10 in Sumgayit is named after our him. His monument was erected in Marneuli, Georgia.

== See also ==
- First Nagorno-Karabakh War

== Sources ==
- Vugar Asgarov. Azərbaycanın Milli Qəhrəmanları (Yenidən işlənmiş II nəşr). Bakı: "Dərələyəz-M", 2010, səh. 260.
