= Shusha State Art Gallery =

Art gallery in Shusha, Azerbaijan

Shusha State Art Gallery Şuşa Dövlət Rəsm Qalereyası
- Established: 1982
- Location: Shusha, Azerbaijan
- Director: Anar Jabizade

Shusha State Art Gallery (Azerbaijani: Şuşa Dövlət Rəsm Qalereyası) is the gallery operated in Shusha from 1982 to 1992. It has been operating in Baku since 1992. After the capture of the city, the exhibits of the museum were looted, and the building itself was neglected for a while.

== About ==
50 paintings and 30 graphic works are displayed in the fund of the art gallery. At the initiative of the gallery, the historical monuments and landscapes of Shusha are reflected in the paintings. A group of young talents operates under the gallery. Exhibitions are regularly organized every year. In 2013, the exhibition prepared by Shusha Art Gallery was shown in Italy.

When Shusha was captured in 1992, it was possible to remove only 8 works from the gallery. During the 28 years that Shusha was under the control of Armenia, the number of works in the collection of the Shusha State Art Gallery reached 600.
