= Albert Agarunov =

Azerbaijani military officer and war hero (1969–1992)

- Born: 25 April 1969; Baku, Azerbaijan SSR, USSR
- Died: 8 May 1992 (aged 23); Shusha, Nagorno-Karabakh
- Burial place: Baku, Azerbaijan
- Father: Agarun Agarunov
- Military career
- Allegiance: USSR (1987–1989); Azerbaijan (1991–1992)
- Branch: Soviet Army; Azerbaijani Land Forces
- Service years: 1987–1992
- Conflicts: First Nagorno-Karabakh War; Battle of Shusha (1992) †

Albert Agarunovich Agarunov (Azerbaijani: Albert Aqarunoviç Aqarunov; 25 April 1969 – 8 May 1992) was an Azerbaijani military officer and prominent war hero in Azerbaijan.

Agarunov was killed in action during the Battle of Shusha, in the First Nagorno-Karabakh War, on 9 May 1992. His actions of valor during the battle posthumously earned him the National Hero of Azerbaijan, highest national title in the country.

== Early life and military career ==
Albert Agarunov was born in a Baku suburb to Mountain Jewish parents, Agarun, who was an oil-worker from Quba, and Leah Agarunov. Albert was one of the family's ten children. During his school years, Albert was interested in music, and he took trumpet lessons. After obtaining a degree in technology, he started working at a machine building factory, as a metal turner.

=== Military service ===
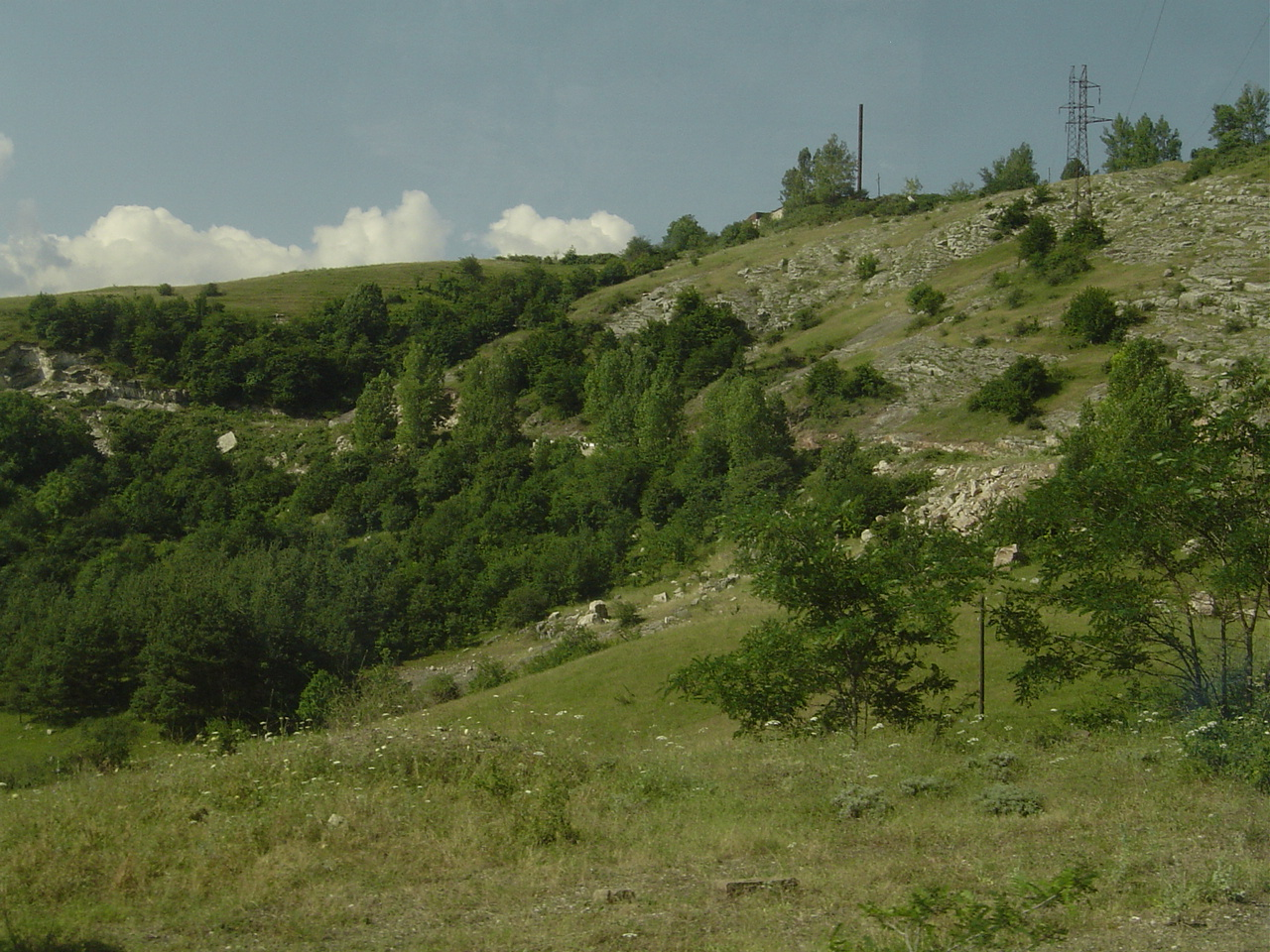
The road to leading to Shusha where the encounter between Avsharian's and Agarunov's tanks took place.

He served in the Soviet Army from 1987 to 1989 in Georgia. Agarunov served as a tank commander during his military service in the Soviet military.

In 1991, Agarunov voluntarily enlisted in the Azerbaijani Army during the First Nagorno-Karabakh War, serving again as a tank commander.

In May 1992, Armenian forces launched a successful assault to capture the strategically important town of Shusha, in order to break the Siege of Stepanakert. Agarunov fought in a battalion led by Elchin Mammadov during the battle, where he took part in a tank engagement against an Armenian T-72 tank commanded by Gagik Avsharian, successfully disabling the tank.

== Death and legacy ==
According to Haji Azimov, an Azerbaijani officer who was present at the battle, Agarunov left his tank to remove the bodies of dead Azerbaijani soldiers lying on the streets of Shusha, and he was hit by sniper fire. Agarunov was killed on the road connecting Shusha to Lachin on 8 May 1992. Agarunov was posthumously awarded the title of National Hero of Azerbaijan and was buried at Martyrs' Lane cemetery in Baku in May 1992, where his funeral was attended by both Imams and Rabbis. The school in Baku from which Albert graduated was renamed after him.

In 2017, a memorial plaque was placed in Albert Agarunov's house in Amirjan settlement of Surakhani district.

On November 15, 2019, the Monument to Albert Agarunov was unveiled in the Narimanov district of Baku.

== Awards ==
- (1992) — National Hero of Azerbaijan
- (2014) — "Son of the Fatherland" order
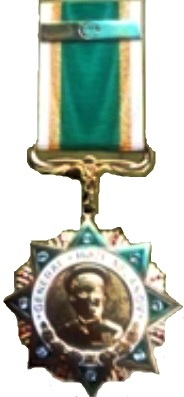
- (2016) — Hazi Aslanov medal
