= Monument to Albert Agarunov =

- Azerbaijani: Albert Aqarunovun heykəli
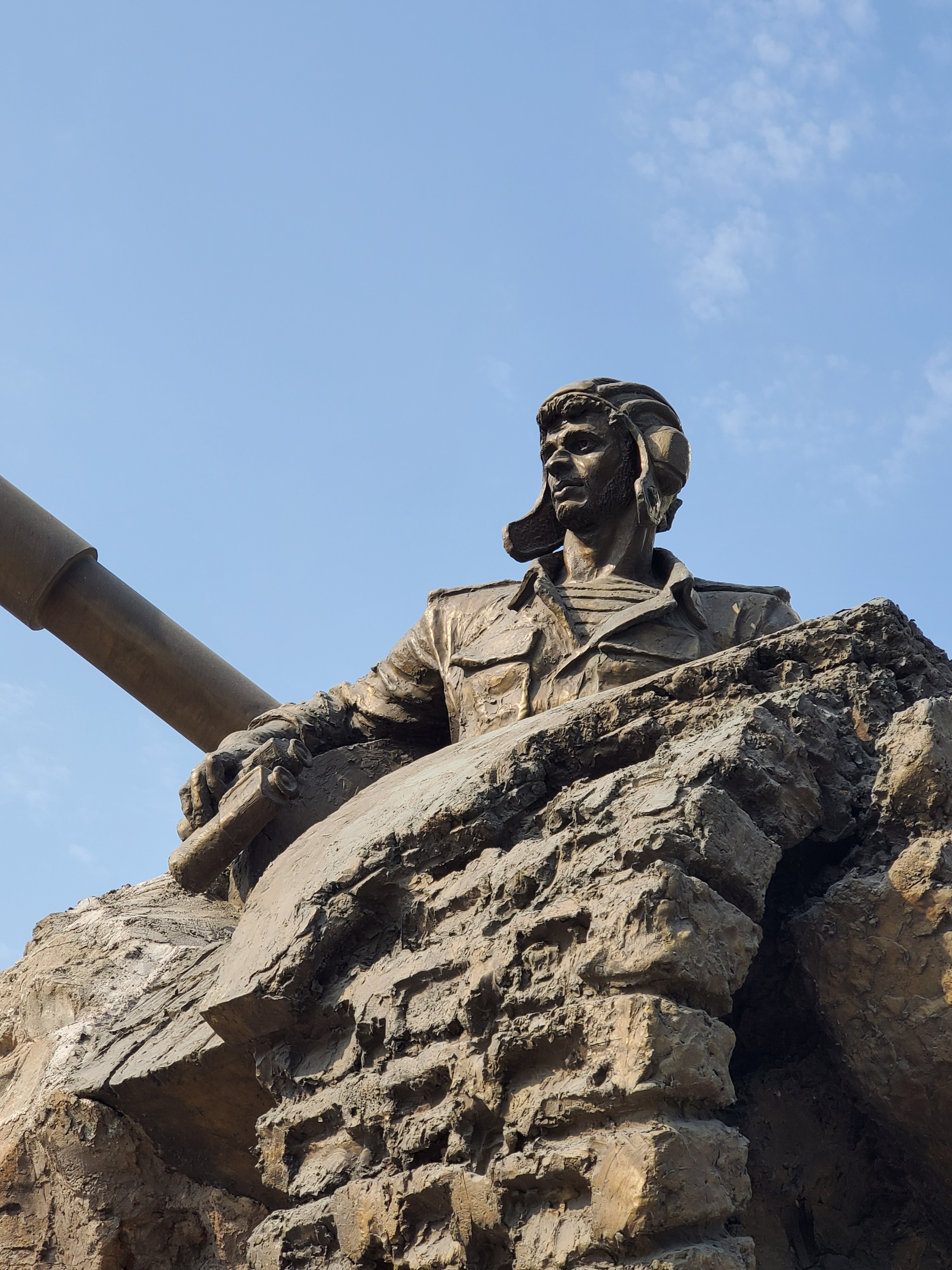
- Albert Agarunov Monument in Baku (October 2021)
- Interactive map of Monument to Albert Agarunov
- Location: Baku, Azerbaijan
- Coordinates: 40°24′21″N 49°51′42″E
- Designer: Rahib Garayev; Zamik Rzayev
- Type: Memorial
- Opening date: April, 2019
- Dedicated to: Albert Agarunov

The monument to Albert Agarunov is a sculptural work of the Azerbaijani sculptor and artist Omar Eldarov, dedicated to the National Hero of Azerbaijan Albert Agarunov.

== History ==
The idea of erecting a monument to Agarunov was proposed by the commander of his tank battalion, Haji Azimov. The project to create the monument was approved by the Ministry of Culture of Azerbaijan in April 2019. Teachers of the State Academy of Arts of Azerbaijan - Rahib Garayev and Zamik Rzayev worked on the creation of the monument.

The monument to Albert Agarunov was unveiled on November 15, 2019, in the Narimanov district of Baku.

Representatives of the Presidential Administration of Azerbaijan, Deputy defense Minister Kerim Veliyev, Chairman of the Mountain Jews Community in Azerbaijan Milikh Evdaev, head of the US Commission on international religious freedom Johnny Moore, several rabbis from Latin America, Europe and the United States, senators from Western states of America, etc. took part in the event dedicated to the opening of the monument.

Every year, on Agarunov's birthday, April 25, there are various events held to commemorate him.

== Composition ==
The process of creating the monument lasted six months. At first, the model of the sculpture was made of clay, then of plaster, and bronze. The rock part was made of concrete.

The monument itself is a sculpture of Albert Agarunov on a tank.

The monument to Albert Agarunov is the second monument dedicated to the Azerbaijani tank man, after the monument to the Hero of the Soviet Union, General of tank forces Hazi Aslanov.

== Gallery ==
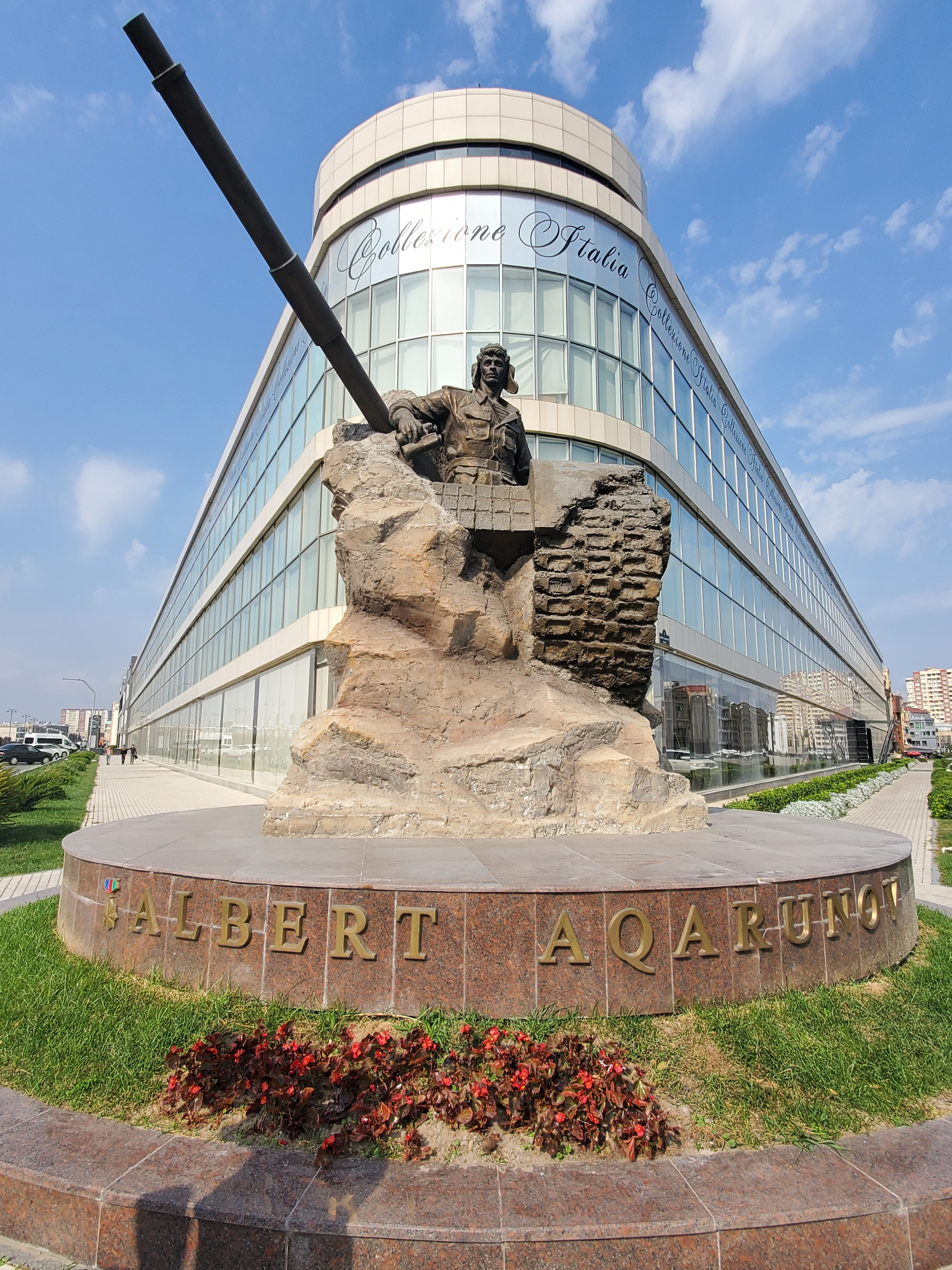

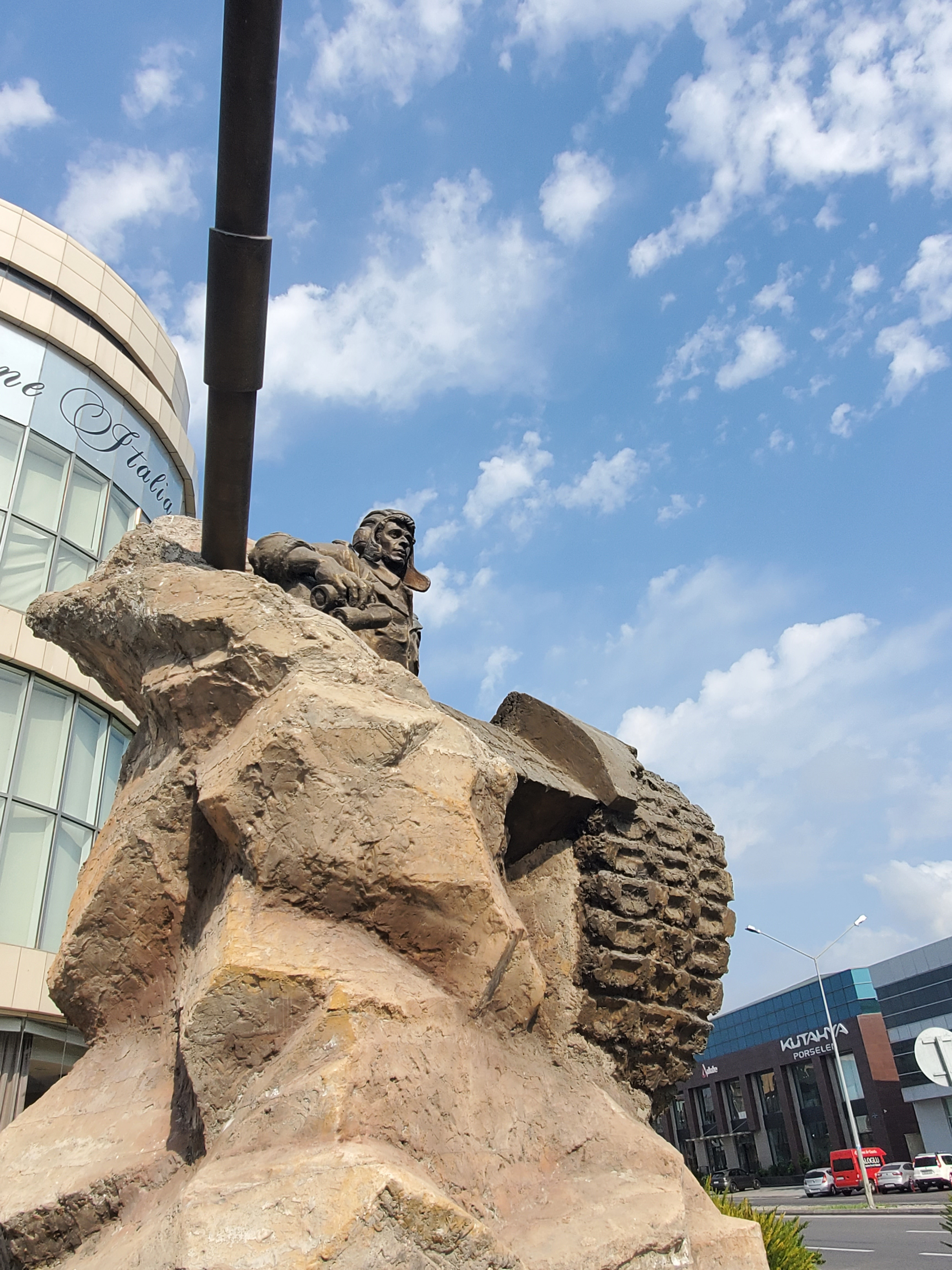

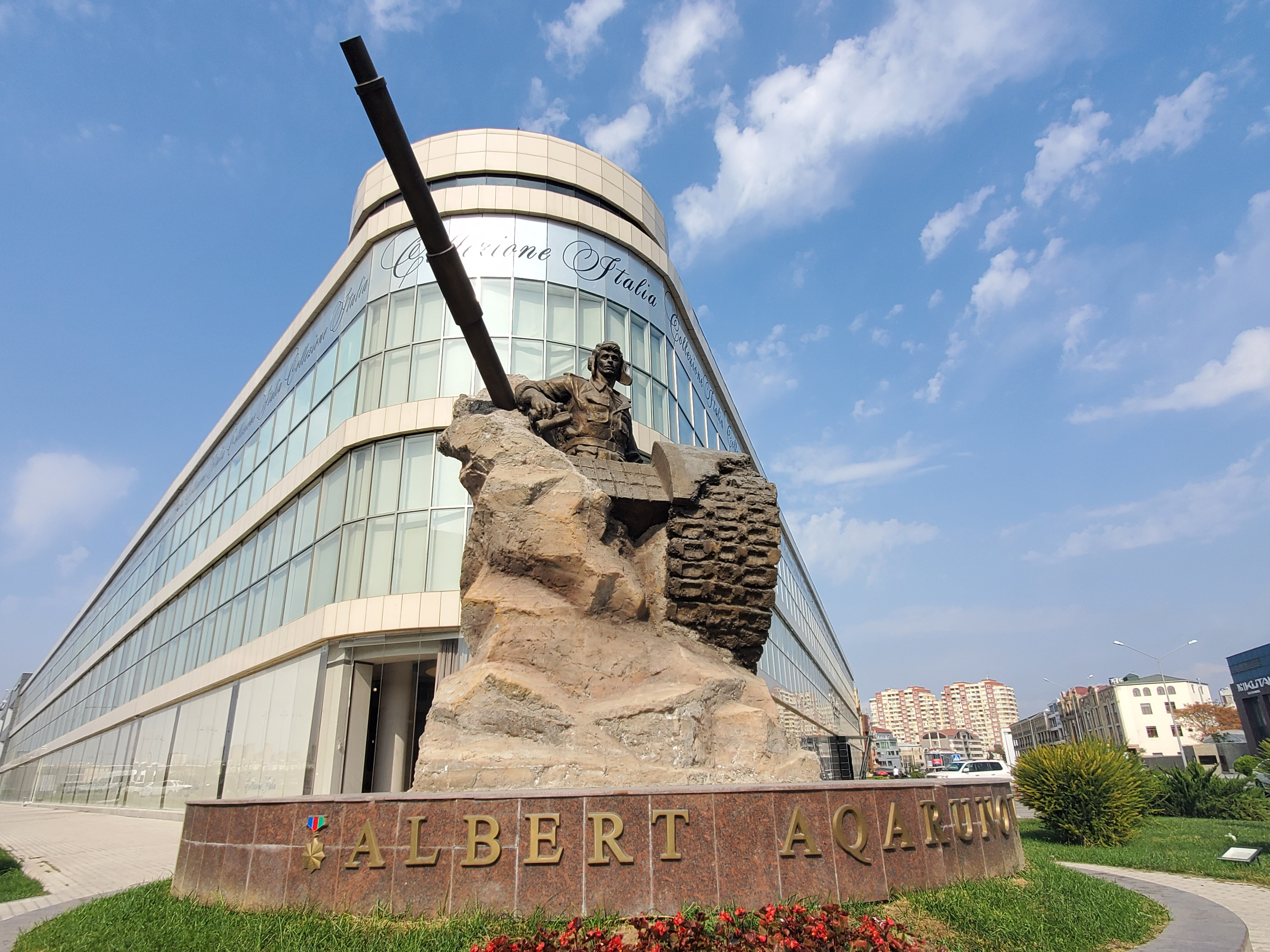

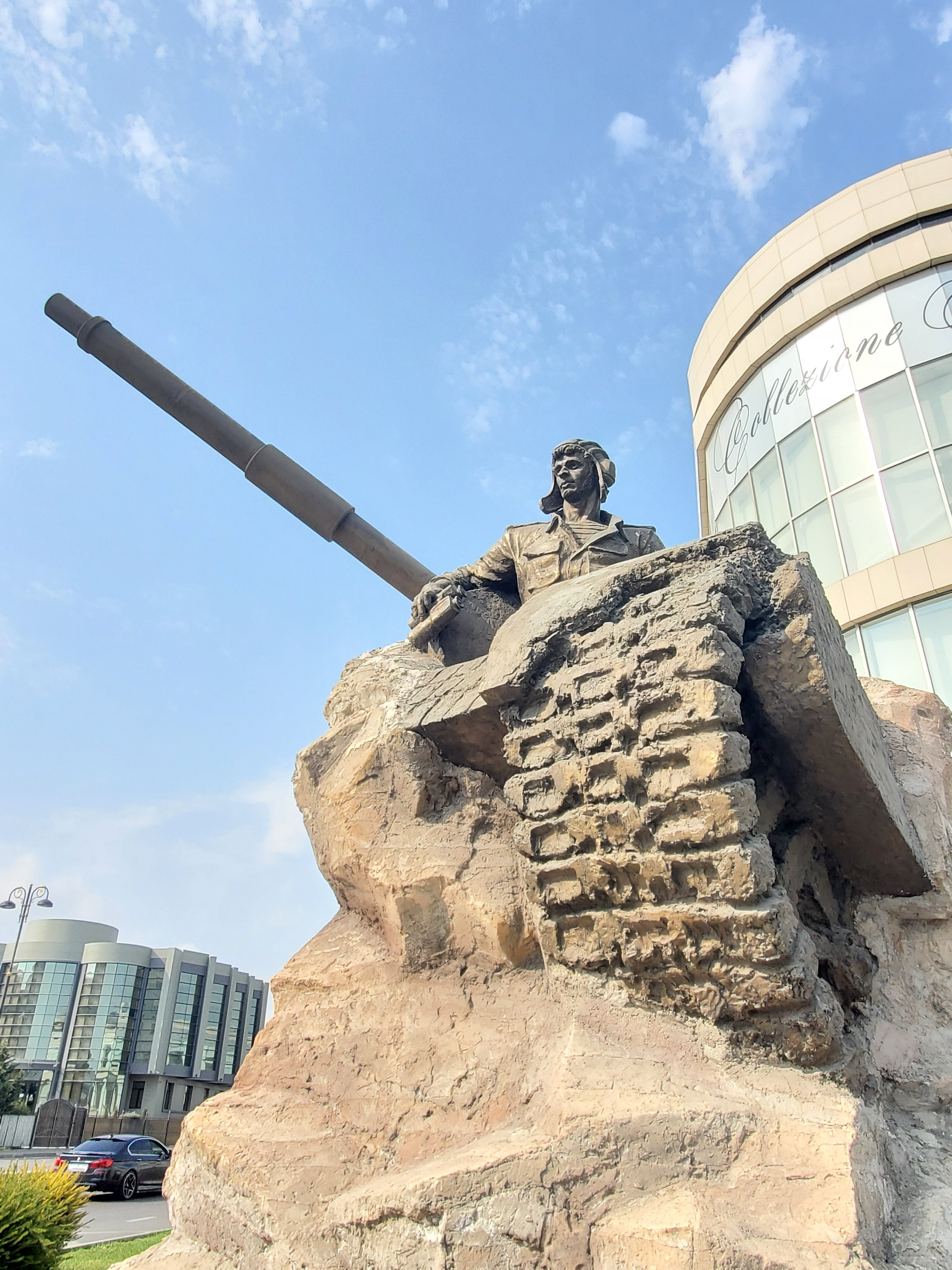

== See also ==
- Albert Agarunov
- History of the Jews in Azerbaijan
