= Battle of Shusha (1992) =

Battle in 1992, during the First Nagorno-Karabakh War

Coordinates: 39°45.5′N 46°44.9′E

- Part of the First Nagorno-Karabakh War
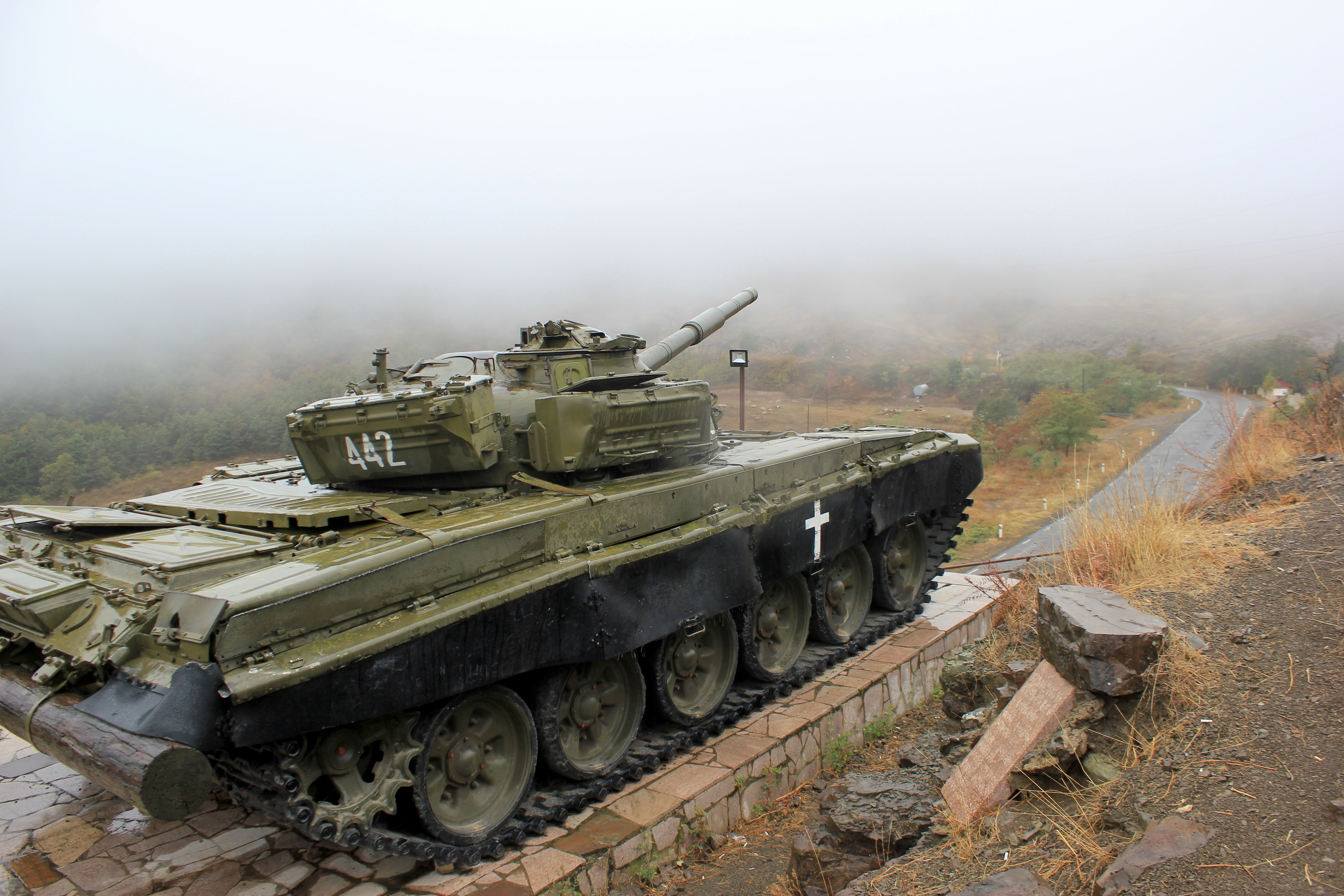
- Gagik Avsharyan's restored T-72 tank commemorating the capture of Shusha
Date	8–9 May 1992
Location	Shusha
Result	Armenian victory
Territorial changes	Siege of Stepanakert ended; Land corridor with Armenia secured

Belligerents
Nagorno-Karabakh; Armenia	(Azerbaijan Democratic Republic) Azerbaijan; Chechen volunteers

Commanders and leaders
(Republic of Artsakh) Arkady Ter-Tadevosyan (Republic of Artsakh) Samvel Babayan (Republic of Artsakh) Seyran Ohanyan (Republic of Artsakh) Robert Kocharyan (Armenia) Gurgen Dalibaltayan (Armenia) Jirair Sefilian (Armenia) Vardan Stepanyan	(Azerbaijan Democratic Republic) Rahim Gaziyev (Azerbaijan Democratic Republic) Elbrus Orujev (Azerbaijan Democratic Republic) Elkhan Orujev (Azerbaijan Democratic Republic) Albert Agarunov † (Chechen Republic of Ichkeria) Shamil Basayev (WIA) (Chechen Republic of Ichkeria) Salman Raduyev

Strength
1,000–1,800 troops 4 tanks 2 Mil Mi-24 helicopters	2,500 troops Several tanks BM-21 Grad artillery

Casualties and losses
35–58 killed	200–300 killed 300 wounded 13–68 POW
- ~15,000 Azerbaijanis displaced

The Battle of Shusha (Note: Referred to by Armenians as Liberation of Shushi (Armenian: Շուշիի ազատագրում Shushii azatagrum) or Operation Wedding in the Mountains (Armenian: «Հարսանիք լեռներում» ռազմագործողություն) and by Azerbaijanis as the Occupation of Shusha (Azerbaijani: Şuşanın işğalı)) (Codenamed: Operation Wedding in The Mountains; Armenian: Հարսանիք լեռներում, Harsaniq lernerum; Russian: Свадьба в горах, Svadba v gorakh) (Armenian: Շուշի, Shushi) was the first significant military victory by Armenian forces during the First Nagorno-Karabakh War. The battle took place in the strategically important mountain town of Shusha on the evening of 8 May 1992, and fighting swiftly concluded the next day after Armenian forces captured it and drove out the defending Azerbaijanis. Armenian military commanders based in Nagorno-Karabakh's capital of Stepanakert had been contemplating capturing the town after Azerbaijani shelling of Stepanakert from Shusha for half a year had led to hundreds of Armenian civilian casualties and mass destruction in Stepanakert.

The capture of the town proved decisive. Shusha was the most important military stronghold that Azerbaijan held in Nagorno-Karabakh – its loss marked a turning point in the war, and led to a series of military victories by Armenian forces in the course of the conflict.

== Background ==
In February 1988, Nagorno-Karabakh had been an autonomous oblast for over sixty years within the borders of the Azerbaijan SSR, though with a majority Armenian population. Following its government's decision to secede from Azerbaijan and re-unify with Armenia, the conflict erupted into a larger scale ethnic feud between Armenians and Azerbaijanis living in the Soviet Union. After the Soviet Union collapsed in 1991, the Armenians and Azerbaijanis vied to take control of Karabakh with full-scale battles in the winter of 1992. By then, the enclave had declared its independence and set up an unrecognized, though self-functioning, government.

The advanced weaponry of tanks, armored fighting vehicles, fighter jets and helicopter gunships deployed by both sides marked the moment of all-out war. Large-scale population movements began as well, with most of the Armenians living in Azerbaijan fleeing to Armenia and the Azerbaijanis in Armenia to Azerbaijan. The battle was preceded by the controversial capture of the town and site of Nagorno-Karabakh's only airport in Khojaly by Armenians in February 1992. With the loss of Khojaly, Azerbaijani commanders concentrated the rest of their efforts on Stepanakert, overlooked by Shusha.

On 26 January 1992 Azerbaijani forces stationed in Shusha encircled and attacked the nearby Armenian village of Karintak (located on the way from Shusha to Stepanakert) attempting to capture it. This operation was conducted by Azerbaijan's then defence minister Tajedin Mekhtiev and was meant to prepare the ground for a future attack on Stepanakert. The operation failed amid strenuous resistance put up by villagers and the Armenian fighters. Mekhtiev was ambushed and up to seventy Azerbaijani soldiers died. After this debacle, Mekhtiev left Shusha and was fired as defence minister. The Armenians to date celebrate the self-defence of Karintak as one of their early and most decisive victories.

=== Shusha as base for shelling Stepanakert ===
Shusha sits on a mountaintop overlooking the NKR's highly populated capital, Stepanakert (just 5 km away), from an elevation of 600m. An old fortress with high walls, the town is five kilometers (four miles) to the south of Stepanakert and perched on a mountaintop with limited vehicular access. From a geographical standpoint Shusha was well-suited for the Azerbaijani shelling of Stepanakert. The main kind of artillery used in the bombardment, which began on 10 January 1992, was the Soviet-made BM-21 GRAD multiple rocket launcher, capable of firing 40 rockets in one volley. The BM-21, the descendant of the World War II-era Katyusha, lacked a precision guided missile system. Dubbed the "flying telephone poles" due to their long, shaped charges, the rockets caused devastating damage to buildings over the course of the siege, hitting residential houses, schools, the city's silk factory, and maternity hospital.

Once the region's Communist Party headquarters and largest city with a population of 70,000, the fighting and shelling had driven away nearly 20,000 of Stepanakert's residents and forced the remainder to live underground in basements. By one tally recorded in early April, a total of 157 rockets had landed on the city in a single day. By early 1992 the bombing intensified. In a course of a week 1,000 shells (800 of which were reactive) fell on the city. On 23 February, ten servicemen in the Russian-led CIS 366th Motorized Rifle Regiment (part of the 23rd Motor Rifle Division, 4th Army), headquartered in Stepanakert and tasked with maintaining peace between the Armenians and Azerbaijanis, were injured and one killed.

Altogether, over 2,000 civilians were killed and thousands more injured in the bombardment in 1992. The city's infrastructure was pulverized with the destruction of sewage networks, water pipes, gas and electricity. In an article that appeared in Time in April 1992, it was noted that "scarcely a single building [had] escaped damage in Stepanakert."

Aside from shelling the city, the Azerbaijani military also launched aerial sorties and staged several ground attacks on the outskirts of Stepanakert. While these were beaten by the city's defenders, Stepanakert's leaders believed that military action had to be taken to relieve it finally from the continuous bombardment. On April 27, the military leaders' plans were approved to move in and capture Shusha.

== The battle ==
=== Preparation ===
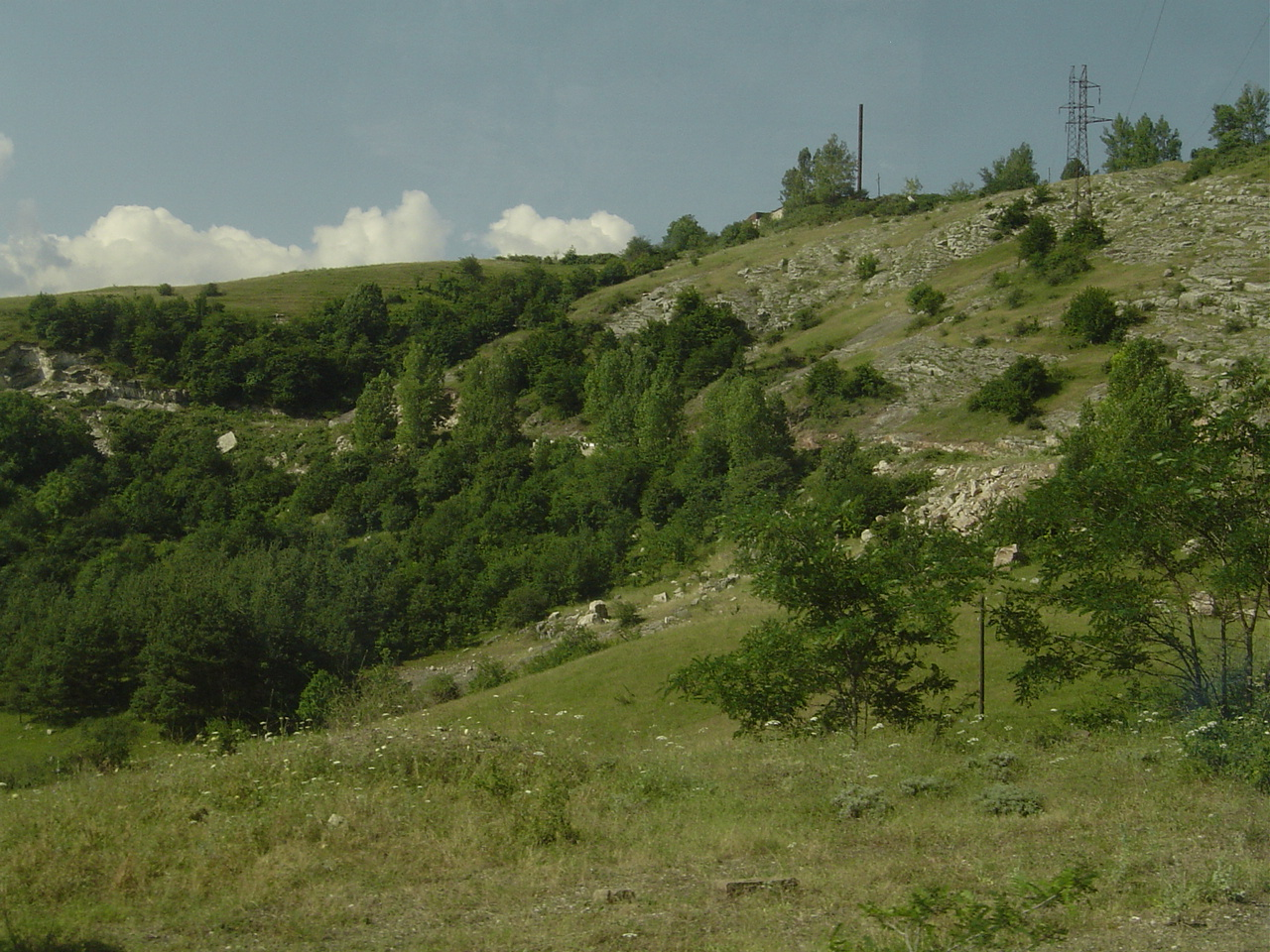
The road to leading to Shusha where the encounter between Avsharyan's and Agarunov's tanks took place.

Colonel-General Gurgen Dalibaltayan, along with Arkady Ter-Tadevosyan, led the planning for the seizure of Shusha. All military factors favored the Azerbaijan army. The Azerbaijanis held advantage in terms of both quantity and the quality of military equipment; they held a numerical superiority and the high ground. The strategic heights commanded by Shusha meant the town could be more easily defended. Dalibaltayan, therefore, ruled out a direct frontal assault. Furthermore, according to military conventions and practices, for the operation to be successful, the attacking party should outnumber the defenders by at least a 3:1 ratio (even more when attacking an above-elevation target), while the NKR detachments simply did not have such manpower at the time. Instead, in conjunction with Ter-Tadevosyan (known among his troops as Komandos), who was tasked to lead the assault, they devised a strategy of launching several diversionary attacks against the adjacent villages to draw out the town's defenders. In the meantime, their forces would encircle and cut off the town from further reinforcements.

=== Order of battle ===
The plan was put together in March–April 1992, after intelligence on the location, positions and the number of the rival forces had been collected. L. Martirosov had a mock-up of Shusha area made, enabling the commanders to outline their actions and directions. The plan was developed in top secrecy. On 28 April the main directions of the operation, the commanders, the resources at hand were finalized.

The plan of attack was signed off on 4 May 1992. In its final form, it defined its objects accordingly:

1. The enemy holds the surrounding positions

- In Shushi elevations with a human resource of 1,200,
- In Zarslu – about 100,
- In Lisagor – about 300–350,
- In Kesalar – about 300.

2. Our task is to:

- a) Defeat the enemy in Lisagor, Zaralu, Janasan, Karagyav;
- b) Defeat the enemy at Shusha approaches, to seize Shushi and to free the city from the Greens (codename for the enemy);
- c) Further advance to Berdadzor and free the Berdadzor district from the Greens;
- d) The enemy has concentrated its main forces in Kesalar, Lisagor, Zarslu, in the environs of Shushi, and encircled the whole city. The way to defeat the enemy is to seize High Point N and take position there.

After the regrouping of forces, advance on to Lisagor and Zarslu and to immediately start the attack in four directions:

- a) Direction of Shosh (eastern), commander – A. Karapetyan
- b) Direction of "26" (northern), commander – V. Chitchyan
- c) Lachin direction /southern), commander – S. Babayan
- d) Kesalar direction (north-eastern), commander – Seyran Ohanyan,
- Commander of reserve troops – Y. Hovhannisyan

To defeat the enemy from the Stepanakert side and Shusha's three sides, then to destroy the enemy and liberate Shushi.

Prior to the assault, Ter-Tadevosyan's forces opened up with an artillery bombardment from several directions, softening up the town's defenses. Since late February, the Azerbaijani military had been reinforcing Shusha and ammunition, and had been shuttling in helicopters to evacuate the town's civilian population. The attack was to start on 4 May, but for a number of reasons (lack of ammunition, adverse weather conditions, etc.) it was delayed. On 8 May, Armenian forces had amassed a force of nearly 1,000 fighters to begin the assault.

=== The offensive ===
In the twilight hours of 8 May, Ter-Tadevosyan directed his forces to assail Shusha from different directions and attack it from the flanks and its rear, avoiding the ridge facing Stepanakert (the town's most easily defendable location). The force was divided into five companies, four of which (under the command of Arkady Karapetyan, Valery Chitchyan, Samvel Babayan and Seyran Ohanyan) would attack from different directions, and the fifth (under command of Yura Ovanisyan) would remain as reserve in case any of the groups needed immediate reinforcement. The main contingent of the attacking force was primarily infantry, but was complemented by at least four tanks and two attack helicopters.

Entrenched in Shusha was the Azerbaijani commander Elbrus Orujev, who commanded a force of several hundred men and tanks. Orujev's men were bolstered by a Chechen volunteer contingent led by guerrilla warlord Shamil Basayev, who were among the last to leave the city. Due to the proximity of the attacking forces, the BM-21s were of no advantage to the defenders.

Orujev's forces managed to fend off the first Armenians who scaled the town's cliffs. By mid-day, the fighting in Shusha escalated into a full-scale engagement, as both sides were involved in fierce combat amid Shusha's battered streets and communications tower. A famous tank battle took place between the two sides when an Armenian T-72, the first to enter Shusha, encountered its Azerbaijani counterpart on the northern approach to the town. The two exchanged fire, and the Armenian tank, manned by Gagik Avsharyan, was hit by several rounds and knocked out of commission. Two of the tank's crew members were killed but Avsharyan survived. By the evening of 8 May, Armenian forces had destroyed three BM-21s and captured the remainder of the battery. Within several hours, the defenders were forced to retreat to the town's southernmost tip.

By 9 May the Armenian forces were firmly in control of Shusha. At the battle-scarred Ghazanchetsots Cathedral they found that the Azerbaijanis had converted it into a storage depot for BM-21 rockets. Overwhelmed by the attacking force, Orujev ordered his forces to retreat and abandon the citadel. Casualty counts were estimated to have been over a hundred on both sides. After capture of the town, the city was looted and burnt by aggrieved Armenian civilians from nearby Stepanakert, who had endured months of bombing and shelling from Azerbaijani forces.

According to the claims of former Azerbaijani residents, some of the shelling was either indiscriminate or intentionally aimed at civilian targets.

== Political fallout ==
Writer Markar Melkonian, brother of Nagorno Karabakh commander Monte Melkonian, would later write that "the capture of Shusha would go down in the annals of local lore as the most glorious victory" in the first half of the war.

The capture of Shusha saw an influx of Armenians from Stepanakert and elsewhere in Karabakh moving to the town. Several days after the assault, Armenian forces launched an attack in the region of Lachin and opened up a 8-kilometer corridor connecting the enclave to Armenia proper. The assault prompted two attacks by Azerbaijan's military. One attempted to retake Shusha on 11 May and the other, farther south, in Martuni. Despite earlier claims made by Azerbaijan's defense ministry to having taken back Shusha, the counterattacks. On the Armenian defended front in Martuni, Armenian forces also turned back an Azerbaijani assault, inflicting heavy losses.

On the day of the Armenian victory, Armenian president Levon Ter-Petrosyan and then acting Azerbaijani president Yagub Mamedov were present in Tehran, Iran to sign a cease-fire agreement. News of the Armenian offensive led Mamedov to accuse Armenia of failing to honor the cease-fire. Ter-Petrosyan, however, contested that he was unable to control what the Armenians in Karabakh were planning. The loss of Shusha later led to mass demonstrations in Azerbaijan's capital of Baku against newly reinstated president Ayaz Mütallibov. Charged for failing to defend the cities of Shusha on 9th and later Lachin on 18th, he was forced to step down. Many Azerbaijanis greeted the news of the town's capture with disbelief: the town had been the birthplace for Azerbaijani composers, poets and musicians and many were convinced it had been betrayed or sold for political purposes. In a television interview in 2000, Basayev dismissed these theories and contended that the town's defenders had simply abandoned their positions.

The city was for a time one of the central items involved in the negotiating process in peace talks held from 1994 to 2020.

== Turkey's involvement ==
The seizure of the town prompted loud complaints from neighboring Turkey. Turkish Prime Minister Süleyman Demirel said that he was under intense public pressure to send military help to Azerbaijan. Demirel, however, did not heed their calls amid heightening tension with Russia. In May 1992, the commander of the CIS forces in the Caucasus, Yevgeny Shaposhnikov, warned that any Turkish incursion would lead to "the verge of a third world war, and that cannot be allowed." The Armenian victory in Shusha had many Turkish officials accusing Armenia of seeking to invade next the Azerbaijani exclave of Nakhchivan.

Because of international pressure, Turkey was ostensibly restricted to providing economic support to Azerbaijan. Nonetheless, the Turkish army and intelligence services launched undercover operations to supply Azerbaijan with arms and military personnel. According to Turkish sources, over 350 high-ranking officers and thousands of volunteers from Turkey participated in the warfare on the Azerbaijani side. Western authors reported several major shipments of weapons from Turkey, including bringing an arsenal of Soviet-made arms from the former East Germany.

Simultaneously, Turkey was engaged in overt intimidation of Armenia. On the international stage it lobbied various organizations and promoted a pro-Azerbaijani bent of mediation and conflict resolution efforts. Turkish diplomats organized "Turkic Summits" for Turkic nations that included Azerbaijan, Kazakhstan, Kyrgyzstan, Turkmenistan, and Uzbekistan to convince the leaders of the Central Asian countries to sever economic ties with Armenia and condemn its military involvement in Nagorno Karabakh.

== Commemorations ==
After the war ended, Avsharyan's T-72 tank was recovered and repaired and was installed as a monument in Shusha. 9 May is now celebrated in Armenia and the Nagorno-Karabakh Republic as "The Day of the NKR's Defence Army" and "Shushi Liberation Day," respectively. A commendation medal was also awarded by the government to those Armenians who participated in the battle. On 22 September 2023, after the Azerbaijani offensive in Nagorno-Karabakh, Azerbaijan dismantled the tank monument.

=== Fifteenth anniversary ===
On 9 May 2007, Armenia and the NKR celebrated the fifteenth anniversary of the town's capture. The festivities included a military parade in Renaissance Square in Stepanakert and a cross-country marathon organized by the Armenian Revolutionary Federation's youth wing that began from Armenia and ended in Shusha during the run up to 9 May. During the processions, then president of the NKR Arkadi Ghukasyan, reiterated the point that the citizens of the republic would have the final say over their future.

The parade was headed by the Nagorno-Karabakh Defense Army's first deputy commander, Major General Movses Hakobyan. Attendants of it included veterans of the battle and the First Nagorno-Karabakh War and veterans from the Second World War since 9 May also marks Victory in Europe day.

In Armenia, prime minister Serzh Sargsyan inaugurated the naming of a square in the capital of Yerevan after Shusha.

== See also ==
- First Nagorno-Karabakh War
- Armenian volunteer units
- Battle of Shusha (2020)
