= Siege of Stepanakert =

Battle during the First Nagorno-Karabakh War

- Part of The First Nagorno-Karabakh War
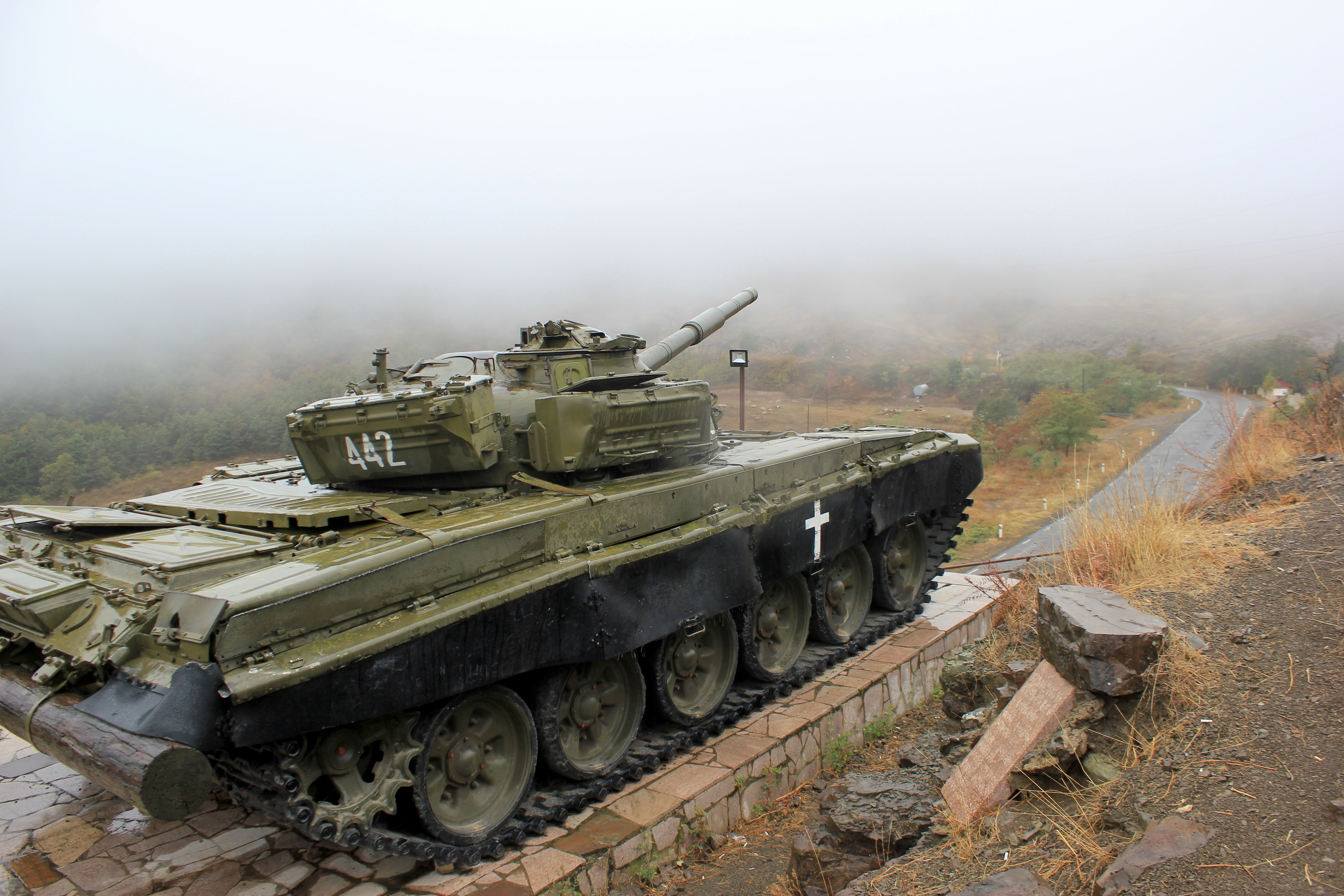
- Gagik Avsharyan's restored T-72 tank commemorating the capture of Shusha and the lifting of the siege of Stepanakert
Date	November 1991 – May 9, 1992
Location	Stepanakert; Azerbaijan (de jure); Nagorno-Karabakh Republic (de facto) 39°48′55″N 46°45′7″E
Result	Armenian victory: Siege lifted by Armenian forces after the Battle of Shusha

Belligerents
Artsakh; Armenia	Azerbaijan

Casualties and losses
169 civilian deaths in Karabakh (October 1991 – April 1992; according to NKR Interior Minister as quoted by Human Rights Watch)	Unknown

The siege of Stepanakert started in late 1991, during the First Nagorno-Karabakh War, in Stepanakert, the largest city in Nagorno-Karabakh, when the Azerbaijani forces circled the city. Until May 1992, the city and its Armenian population were the target of a months-long campaign of bombardment by Azerbaijan. The bombardment of Stepanakert and adjacent Armenian towns and villages, which took place under the conditions of total blockade by Azerbaijan, caused widespread destruction and many civilian deaths.

Human Rights Watch reported that the main bases used by Azerbaijani Armed Forces for the bombardment of Stepanakert included the towns of Khojaly and Shusha. Azerbaijani forces used weapons such as the BM-21 Grad multiple-launch rocket systems. The indiscriminate shelling, sniper shooting and aerial attacks killed or maimed hundreds of civilians and destroyed homes, hospitals, and other buildings that were not legitimate military targets, and generally terrorized the civilian population. As a result of the offensive launched by Azerbaijan on Nagorno-Karabakh, more than 40,000 people became refugees, and dozens of villages were burnt and ruined.

According to the Memorial Human Rights Center, the residential areas of both Stepanakert and Shusha were shelled on a regular basis with the use of artillery and rocket launchers. There was more destruction and casualties in Stepanakert than in Shusha, which could be explained by the location of Stepanakert in the lowland and much higher intensity of shelling from Shusha due to Azerbaijan's capture of Soviet depots in Aghdam and other locales with more than 11,000 wagons full of rockets, including those for BM-21 MLRS.

The siege of the city stopped only after the capture of Shusha by Armenian forces on May 8–9, 1992 and the opening of the Lachin corridor to Armenia. Being the only road between these two territories, the Lachin corridor was considered a humanitarian corridor or lifeline to the Armenian population of Nagorno-Karabakh. Until Armenia secured the Lachin corridor, the Armenians of Nagorno-Karabakh were entirely isolated, relying solely on their own limited resources and aid flown in from Armenia. At that time, humanitarian aid from the Red Cross, the UN, and France were blocked by Azerbaijani authorities.

== Background ==
Stepanakert is a city located on Karabakh Plateau at the center of the Nagorno-Karabakh, a mountainous and landlocked region situated in the South Caucasus. Although Armenian sources state that the settlement was first mentioned as Vararakn (Armenian: Վարարակն, meaning "rapid spring"), named after the river flowing through it, Azerbaijani references generally say that the settlement was founded in the late eighteenth century as a private residence for khans of the Karabakh Khanate, and was thus called Khankendi (Azerbaijani: Xankəndi, literally "the khan's village").

After the establishment of the Soviet authority, Khankendi was renamed Stepanakert (Armenian: Ստեփանակերտ, literally "the city of Stepan") by the decree of the Central Executive Committee of the Azerbaijani SSR, dated August 10, 1923, to honour Stepan Shaumian, leader of the 26 Baku Commissars. After that, Stepanakert was made the capital of the Nagorno-Karabakh Autonomous Oblast (NKAO) and gradually became a chief city for the Armenians in the region. According to the 1979 Soviet census, the city had a population of 38,980 people, mostly of Armenians, who constituted 87% of the total population, and more than four thousand Azerbaijanis.

In September 1988, a mass looting and pogrom took place, directed against the ethnic Azerbaijani population of the city, known as the Stepanakert pogrom. As a result, the city's Azerbaijani population fled the city.

=== Blockade ===
Azerbaijan blockaded railroad lines and the delivery of oil and natural gas to Armenia and Nagorno-Karabakh since 1989. Since the fall of 1991 the imposed blockade became full and continuous. The blockades shattered the Armenian economy, sparked social unrest and created a devastating humanitarian crisis. Throughout the spring of 1992, Stepanakert (which had fifty five thousand inhabitants) was under siege – Azerbaijan had cut all the land communication between Armenia and Nagorno-Karabakh. Stepanakert had no access by road to Armenia for almost two years and its only link to the outside world was by helicopter across the mountains to Armenia. Thus many of its residents had been virtually trapped there all that time.

As a result of tightening of the blockade by Azerbaijan all essential supplies, including water, electricity, food and medicines were virtually cut off. The Armenians living in Stepanakert had to spend almost the whole time sheltering in basements and cellars in appalling conditions. According to Human Rights Watch,

By winter of 1991–1992, as a result of Azerbaijan's three-year economic and transport blockade, Nagorno-Karabakh was without fuel, electricity, running water, functioning sanitation facilities and most consumer goods.

It was in these conditions of total blockade that Azerbaijan subjected Stepanakert to shelling and bombardment.

== The siege ==
During the winter of 1991–92, Stepanakert was hit by artillery and aerial bombardment by Azerbaijani forces. In May 1992, when Helsinki Watch arrived to Stepanakert, the city had already suffered heavy destruction. On August 22–24 alone, Azerbaijani bombings had caused at least 40 civilian deaths and left 100 people wounded.

Helsinki Watch's report stated that the "Azerbaijani shelling and bombing were reckless and indiscriminate, and aimed at terrorizing and forcing out Armenian civilians. Like previous Azerbaijani attacks on Stepanakert, the shelling and bombing throughout the counter-offensive and beyond destroyed or damaged scores of homes and sometimes entire villages." According to Caroline Cox, "I used to count 400 Grad missiles every day pounding in on Stepanakert." The shelling aimed to intimidate and oust the Armenian civilian population from Karabakh and to take military control. David Atkinson, a member of the Council of Europe, reminded PACE that he visited Nagorno-Karabakh in the early 1990s, and added that he "will never forget" the Azerbaijani bombing of Stepanakert during a report on January 25, 2005, during the PACE winter session.

"Anyone could just get up with a hangover, after drinking the night before, sit behind the Grad and fire, fire, fire at Stepanakert without any aim, without any coordinates."

— Azerbaijani soldier Aiaz Kerimov

Geographically Stepanakert lay in the most vulnerable position, with Aghdam 15 miles to the East, Khojaly to the North and Shusha to the South. The Azeri controlled towns of Shusha and Khojaly were overlooking Stepanakert and were used as main bases for shelling and bombing the capital. Helsinki Watch writes, "While Azerbaijani forces held the town of Shusha, which overlooks Stepanakert, they pounded the latter with Grads and heavy artillery fire, hitting civilians, residential areas, hospitals, and the like... Russian pilot Anatolii Chistiakov said that the Azerbaijanis routinely ask mercenary pilots to drop tear gas to cause panic among civilians."

The mainstay artillery platforms used in the bombardment, which began on January 10, 1992 and lasted for 4 months, was the Soviet built BM-21 GRAD multiple rocket launcher capable of firing 40 rockets simultaneously, a modern variant of the widely used World War II weapon, the Katyusha. The GRAD launcher was similar to the Katyusha in that it did not have a well-guided missile system and hence the location of where it would hit was difficult to determine. Essentially, GRAD is designed to deliver anti-personnel devastation on an open battlefield, while the Azerbaijani Army used it to shell civilians in a densely populated capital of Nagorno-Karabakh. Dubbed "flying telephone poles" due to their long, thin shape, the missiles caused devastating damage to buildings including the destruction of residential houses, schools, the city's silk factory, maternity hospital and at least one kindergarten.

On May 31, 1992, the Chicago Tribune wrote:

After six months of daily bombardments by Azerbaijani missiles, the damage that is visible in this isolated city of 70,000 Armenians is frightening enough. There are jagged, blackened holes in nearly every building. There is no water, electricity, food or fuel.

=== Armenian response ===
By May 1992, Shusha was the only Azerbaijani-controlled area near Stepanakert during the First Nagorno-Karabakh War, which was used to launch GRAD missiles into Stepanakert's neighborhoods. Almost all of the civilian population of Karabakh was concentrated in Stepanakert after leaving due to the battle zone, and even poorly aimed bombing by Azerbaijani aircraft resulted in heavy losses of civilians. Karabakh's self-defense forces retaliated, and in two days of fighting captured Shusha the last Azerbaijani inhabited area in Nagorno-Karabakh. Thus they gained control over Nagorno-Karabakh, which brought an end to shelling and bombardment of Stepanakert, the capital of the breakaway Nagorno-Karabakh Republic.

Daily bombardment by Azerbaijan's Grad missiles and attacks on Goris and Kapan caused thousands of civilian and military deaths, and massive property destruction. Bombs had been constantly directed towards Stepanakert, until the capture of Shusha, on May 8, 1992.

The town of Khojaly was on the road from Shusha and Stepanakert to Aghdam and had the region's only airport. The airport was of vital importance for the survival of the population in Karabakh, which had no land connection with Armenia and was under a total blockade by Azerbaijan. According to reports from Human Rights Watch, Khojaly was used as a base for Azerbaijani forces for shelling the city of Stepanakert. In February 1992, Artsakhi Self Defense forces captured Khojaly as this was the only way to stop the bombardment of Stepanakert from Khojaly and to break the blockade.

== International reactions ==
The United States Congress condemned Azerbaijan's blockade and aggression against Armenia and Nagorno-Karabakh passing amendment N: 907 to the Freedom Support Act (1992) which banned the US direct support to the government of Azerbaijan. The bill namely stated:

United States assistance under this or any other Act may not be provided to the Government of Azerbaijan until the President determines that the Government of Azerbaijan is taking demonstrable steps to cease all blockades and other offensive uses of force against Armenia and Nagorno-Karabakh.

Human rights organisation Christian Solidarity International (CSI) in its report on the First Nagorno-Karabakh War concludes that Azerbaijan was the primary aggressor and initiator of the Karabakh war because Azerbaijan 1) organized forcible deportations of Armenians from Nagorno-Karabakh, 2) imposed a blockade on Karabakh and Armenia, 3) used heavy military force and bombarded the civilian areas. The report also states,

Azerbaijan has sought from the beginning of the conflict to achieve its aims by steadily escalating military means. The Armenian community of Nagorno Karabakh is the primary victim in this tragic conflict.

=== Helsinki Watch ===
A delegation of members from Helsinki Watch had gone to Stepanakert for two days. Armenians had said that Stepanakert was constantly attacked by Azerbaijanis, starting around 1991, in October. The Helsinki Watch members had gone around the city and had observed the widespread damage and photographed many damages to civilian areas. The delegation also noticed that almost every apartment in Stepanakert's western side, had been hit by shelling.

Representatives of Helsinki Watch, had photographed the complete destruction of a hospital, and also school buildings in parts of the city.

The Helsinki Watch concluded in their Annual Report that Azerbaijani forces had "pounded the capital of Nagorno Karabakh, Stepanakert, and other Armenian towns and villages with shells and grenades. The indiscriminate shelling and sniper shooting killed or maimed hundreds of civilians, destroyed homes, hospitals and other objects that are not legitimate military targets."

=== Journalists' accounts ===
Vanora Bennett, British reporter,

Stepanakert was in a frenzy of spring-cleaning. In brilliant sunshine, tiny old women were sweeping up rubble and shifting bits of wall. The crunch of broken glass being dragged over broken pavements was the loudest sound. There were ruined buildings on all sides, and almost every house had some trace of war damage, an exposed roof, bullet holes, cracks, staring windows. There were no shops, no gas, no electricity, no phones, no post, and no cash money.

Journalist Vadim Byrkin,

If I have a memory, it is the cold. When you spend the night sleeping in a bomb shelter, in a basement, and when the stove goes out before morning, then it gets terribly cold. In the morning, when you go upstairs, you don't know whether your home will be there or not.

The Montreal Gazette reported,

Yesterday morning, Sukhoi-25 jets raided residential areas of Stepanakert and dropped bombs near an Armenian church, Christ the Savior, in nearby Shusha at the precise moment the divine liturgy was being said.

Anzhelika Chechina, Russian Journalist and Human Rights Activist:

January 21–25 I was in Stepanakert. The city still had no electricity or water. Water was so difficult to obtain that drinking tea was disgraceful. There were no products to trade for food stamps. There were cases of hunger edema in the city. Stepanakert reminded me of documentaries about the Nazi-blockade of Leningrad.

Los Angeles Times reporter John-Thor Dahlburg:

People here are in their third month of life in the catacombs, and some are desperate...

In the besieged wartime capital of the self-proclaimed Nagorno-Karabakh Republic, life has reverted to Stone Age urgency and precariousness. Take, for example, drinking water, a pressing concern since the Azerbaijanis shut off electricity to pumps that drive the waterworks in this predominantly Armenian city of 70,000...

In her underground retreat, Lidia Airepetyan awakened one night because of a stirring by her head. "For three months, we haven't washed; we have forgotten what a bath is," said the teacher and mother of three children. She and 36 other families living under their apartment house have no bread since bakeries have shut, so they hull raw wheat and boil it instead. "We basically are surviving off tea," Airepetyan said. "There are no more noodles, no rice."

Chicago Tribune reporter Michael McGuire:

The capital, Stepanakert, is under daily artillery bombardment. Not a single home is heated or has electricity, because the blockade has cut off all incoming fuel... Every village has its own defense force because every village is in the war zone.

The UK Daily Telegraph:

Azerbaijan's air force bombed the capital of the ethnic Armenian enclave of Nagorno-Karabakh on Saturday destroying a hostel for refugees and killing at least 10 people, according to media reports. A spokesman for Nagorno-Karabakh's regional legislature said two Sukhoi-25 bombers attacked Stepanakert with 1100 pound shells hitting the hostel and killing "dozens" of people. The ITAR-TASS news agency said civilians were buried in the rubble of their homes and the number of casualties was uncertain.

Russian writer and human rights activist Inessa Burkova:

Azerbaijani artillery was shelling Artsakh from all sides for about two years. They were shelling not the military positions of Karabakh self-defence army but the civilian areas. And from mid February against the townspeople and villagers of Artsakh they used weapons of mass destruction – Grad rocket-launchers, which is a prohibited weapon. Both the international community and the new, democratic leaders of Russia were silent and did not hold Azerbaijan accountable for violating the international law.

Russian journalist Galina Kovalskaya

The Azerbaijani side loses more militarily but the Armenian side evidently has far more losses among the civilian population because the battles take place mainly in the Armenian-populated regions (Armenians are the majority in Karabakh). On top of that, all the Karabakh Armenians are exhausted as a result of militarization of daily life. There is not enough fuel; gas pipeline is constantly blown up, it is cold, and in blockaded towns there is famine…

== See also ==
- Battle of Shusha (1992)
- First Nagorno-Karabakh War
- Sumgait pogrom (1988)
- Kirovabad pogrom (1988)
- Pogrom of Armenians in Baku (1990)
- Operation Ring (1991)
- Maraga Massacre (1992)
- Anti-Armenian sentiment in Azerbaijan
