= Turshsu, Nagorno-Karabakh =

Turshsu / Lisagor Turşsu / Լիսագոր
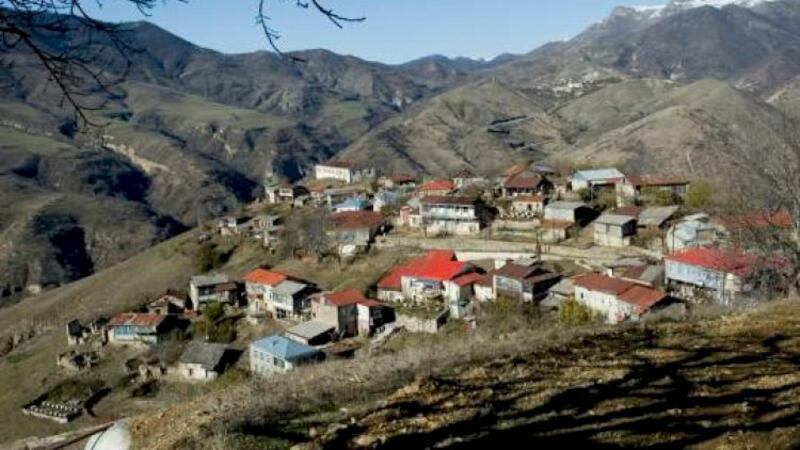

- Location within Azerbaijan
- Coordinates: 39°41′15″N 46°38′35″E
- Country: Azerbaijan
  - District: Shusha

Population (2015)
  - Total: 130
- Time zone: UTC+4

Turshsu (Azerbaijani: Turşsu) or Lisagor (Armenian: Լիսագոր) is a village that is in the Shusha District of Azerbaijan, in the disputed region of Nagorno-Karabakh.

== History ==
The village was founded in the beginning of the 20th century as the Russian settlement of Lysogor (Russian: Лысогор) in the Shusha Uyezd of the Elisabethpol Governorate in the Russian Empire. In 1914, 36 people lived in the village, mostly Russians.

During the Soviet period, the village was part of the Shusha District of the Nagorno-Karabakh Autonomous Oblast.

== Economy and culture ==
The population is mainly engaged in agriculture and animal husbandry. As of 2015, the village has a municipal building, a house of culture, a secondary school, and a medical centre. The Lisagor branch of the Shushi Children's Music School is also located in the village.

== Demographics ==
The village had 88 inhabitants in 2005, and 130 inhabitants in 2015. The Azerbaijani population fled the fighting in the First Nagorno-Karabakh War.
