= Monuments of Shusha =

List of monuments of Shusha, a city in the disputed region of Nagorno-Karabakh in the South Caucasus.

1. Kurgan – Bronze Age (north-west of Shusha)
2. Shusha and Sushakend stone graves - Last Bronze and First Iron Age (near Shusha)
3. Shusha cave camp - Stone Age (south of Shusha city, on the left bank of the Dashalty River)
4. Shusha stone box necropolis - Iron Age (Garabulag village)
5. Necropolis - The Last Bronze and First Iron Age (Dolanlar village)
6. Shusha fortress - 1754 (Shusha city)
7. Panah Khan castle - 18th century (Shusha city)
8. Gara Boyuk khanum tower – 18th century (Shusha city)
9. Haji Heydar tomb - (Shusha city)
10. Hajigullar's palace - 18th century (Shusha city)
11. Natavan's house - 18th century (Shusha city)
12. House of Asad bey - 18th century (Shusha city)
13. Yukhari Govhar Agha Mosque - 1768–1769
14. Ashaghi Govhar Agha Mosque - 18th century (Shusha city)
15. Two-storey caravanserai - 19th century (Shusha city)
16. Karim bey Mehmandarov mansion complex: mosque, residence, - 18th century (Shusha city)
17. Isa spring - 19th century (near the city of Shusha)
18. Ibrahim Khan castle - 18th century (Dashalty village)
19. Taza Mahalla Mosque - 19th century (Shusha city)
20. House-Museum of Uzeyir Hajibeyov - 19th century (Shusha city)
21. Azerbaijan State Museum of History of Karabakh - 20th century (Shusha city)
22. Khanluk Mukhtar Caravanserai - 18th century (Shusha city)
23. Caravanserai of Agha Gahraman Mirsiyab, Mirsiyab's son - 18th century (Shusha city)
24. House of Zulfugar Hajibeyov - 19th century (Shusha city)
25. Saatli Mosque - 18th century (Shusha city)
26. Ganja Gate - 18th century (Shusha city)
27. Abdurrahim bey Hagverdiyev's house - 18th century (Shusha city)
28. Qazançı church - 19th century (Shusha city)
29. Yusif Vazir Chamanzaminli's house - 18th century (Shusha city)
30. Upper Mosque madrasah - 18th century (Shusha city)
31. Safarov brothers' caravanserai - 18th century (Shusha city)
32. house of tar player Sadigjan - 18th century (Shusha city)
33. House of Ughurlu bey - 18th century (Shusha city)
34. Palace of Karabakh Khans - 18th-19th centuries (Shusha city)
35. Shirin Su hammam - 18th century (Shusha city)
36. House of Khananda Seyid Shushinski – 19th century (Shusha city)
37. Tomb of poet Molla Panah Vagif - 20th century (Shusha City)
38. House of Gasim bey Zakir - 18th century (Shusha city)
39. Madrasah - 18th century (Shusha city)
40. House of Behbudovs - 18th century (Shusha city)
41. House of Firidun bey Kocharli - 18th century (Shusha city)
42. House of Mir Mohsun Navvab – 18th century (Shusha city)
43. House of Bulbul - 19th century (Shusha city)
44. House of Firidun bey Kocharli - 19th century (Shusha city)
45. House of Hussein bey - 18th century (Shusha city)
46. House of Mohammed - 19th century (Shusha city)
47. Caravanserai - 18th century (Shusha city)
48. House of Garay Asadov - 18th century (Shusha city)
49. House of Suleyman Sani Akhundov – 19th century (Shusha city)
50. House of Jabbar Garyaghdioglu – 18th century (Shusha city)
51. Shusha Realni School - 20th century (Shusha city)
52. Hospital building - 19th century (Shusha city)
53. Residential building - 19th century (Shusha city)
54. Girls’ school – 19th century (Shusha city)
55. House of Aslan Garasharov - 19th century (Shusha city)
56. House of Mashadi Ibrahim - 29th century (Shusha city)
57. Residence - 18th century (Shusha city)
58. House of Mashadi Nowruz – 19th century (Shusha city)
59. House of Hasan Agha – 19th century (Shusha city)
60. Residence – 19th century (Shusha city)
61. Residence – 18th century (Shusha city)
62. House of Shukur bey – 19th century (Shusha city)
63. House of Jafargulu agha Javanshir Agha – 18th century (Shusha city)
64. church ruins (Shusha city)
65. Tomb – (Shusha city)
66. Spring – 18th century (Shusha city)
67. “Lachin” water reservoir - 19th century (Shusha city)
68. Maiden monastery - 18th century (Shusha city)
69. House of Suleyman Vezirov – 19th century (Shusha city)
70. Hammam – 19th century (Malibeyli village)
71. Mosque - 19th century (Malibeyli village)
72. Novlu spring – 19th century (Malibeyli village)
73. Administrative building - 19th century (Malibeyli village)
74. House of Mamay bey - 18th century (Shusha city)
75. House of Mashadi Teymur - 18th century (Shusha city)
76. Shor spring - 19th century (Shusha city)
77. House of Khalil Mammadov - 19th century (Shusha city)
78. House of Alakbar bey - 19th century (Shusha city)
79. Chukhur Mahalla Mosque - 19th century (Shusha city)
80. House of Latif Imanov - 18th century (Shusha city)
81. Haji Abbas Mosque and Caravanserai - 19th century (Shusha city)
82. Mardinli Mosque - 19th century (Shusha city)
83. House of Jahangir bey Novruzov - 18th century (Shusha city)
84. House of Haji Mammad - 18th century (Shusha city)
85. Haji Yusifli Mosque - 18th century (Shusha city)
86. House of Mashadi Salman - 18th century (Shusha city)
87. Julfas mosque - 19th century (Shusha city)
88. Mill - beginning of the 20th century (Shusha city)
89. House of Haji Alibala - 18th century (Shusha city)
90. Home of Kabla Azad - 19th century (Shusha city)
91. House of Haji Sadir - 19th century (Shusha city)
92. "Chol Gala" spring - 18th century (Shusha city)
93. The house of Mashadi Sulayman - 18th century (Shusha city)
94. House of Mousavi - 18th century (Shusha city)
95. House of Haji Mammadbagir - 19th century (Shusha city)
96. House of Husu Hajiyev - 19th century (Shusha city)
97. House of Mashadi Zeynal Hatamov - 18th century (Shusha city)
98. House of Mashadi Ali - 18th century (Shusha city)
99. House of Mashadi Shahriyar - 18th century (Shusha city)
100. House of Haji Dadash - 18th century (Shusha city)
101. House of A. Azimov - 18th century (Shusha city)
102. House of Mashadi Ibrahim - 18th century (Shusha city)
103. House of Mashadi Jalal - 18th century (Shusha city)
104. Meidan spring - 18th century (Shusha city)
105. House of Haji Bashir - 18th century (Shusha city)
106. House of Darzi Bahram - 18th century (Shusha city)
107. House of Mashadi Husu - 18th century (Shusha city)
108. House of Mohammed Hasan oghlu - 18th century (Shusha city)
109. House of Kabla Mohammad - 19th century (Shusha city)
110. Khoja Marjanli Mosque - 18th century (Shusha city)
111. Khoja Mercanli spring - 18th century (Shusha city)
112. Treasury of Bahman Mirza - 19th century (Shusha city)
113. Food storage of Bahman Mirza - 19th century (Shusha city)
114. House of Gulamshah - 19th century (Shusha city)
115. House of Najaf bey Vazirov - 19th century (Shusha city)
116. Kocharli mosque - 19th century (Shusha city)
117. Guyulug Mosque - XVIII century (Shusha city)
118. House of Seyid Mejid - 18th century (Shusha city)
119. Spring (Seyidli Mahalla) - 18th century (Shusha city)
120. Seyidli Mosque – 18th century (Shusha city)
121. House of Mashadi Gara - 18th century (Shusha city)
122. House of Kabla Yusif - 19th century (Shusha city)
123. House of Zohrabeyov 19th century (Shusha city)
124. House of Mashadi Ibish- 18th century (Shusha city)
125. House of Mashadi Zulfugar - 19th century (Shusha city)
126. House of Haji Aslan - 18th century (Shusha city)
127. House of Haji Malik's son - 18th century (Shusha city)
128. House Mir Hasan Vezirov - 19th century (Shusha city)
129. Mamayi Mosque – 19th century (Shusha city)
130. Mamayi spring – 19th century (Shusha city)
131. House of Faramazovs - 18th century (Shusha city)
132. Spring (Haji Yusifli Mahalla) – 18th century (Shusha city)
133. Spring (Aghadadali Mahalla) – 19th century (Shusha city)
134. Spring (Kocharli Mahalla) – 18th century (Shusha city)
135. Spring (Chukhur Mahalla) – 18th century (Shusha city)
136. Pottery spring – 18th century (Zarisli village)
