= Treasury of Bahman Mirza =

- Bəhmən Mirzə xəzinəsi (in Azerbaijani)

General information
- Location: Shusha, Azerbaijan
- Construction started: late 19th century
- Completed: late 19th century
- Demolished: unknown

Technical details
- Floor count: 1
- Floor area: 3 rooms

Design and construction
- Architect: Bahman Mirza

Treasury of Bahman Mirza (Azerbaijani: Bəhmən Mirzə xəzinəsi), also called Bahman Mirza Mausoleum (Azerbaijani: Bəhmən Mirzə xəzinəsi məqbərəsi) is a tomb which was built in honour of the Prince Bahman Mirza Qajar from Qajar dynasty of Iran who was a prominent politician in the 19th century.

== Prince Bahman Mirza ==
Bahman Mirza Qajar was born on October 11, 1811, in Tehran. He was the son of the Persian Crown Prince Abbas Mirza and princess Assiya Khanom. In 1831-1834 he was the governor of Ardebil. In 1848, Bahman Mirza escaped from Iran to Tiflis under a threat of being arrested. With the permission of the Russian Tsar, he settled in Shusha town on October 4, 1851, with his harem consisting of 7 wives and 19 children. In Shusha, Bahman Mirza built a palace complex which included a two-story house with 15–16 rooms, rounded balconies, large oval hall, garden. In the big garden there were several houses consisting of 5–6 rooms for each of his wives and many more buildings including horse barns, storages, kitchens, etc. There was also a school for his children, a mosque and a bath house. In 1905, the palace of Bahman Mirza was burned by Armenians. The palace was later reconstructed by his son Gulam Shah Mirza Qajar.

== The treasury mausoleum ==
The tomb mausoleum is located in the city of Shusha in the contested Nagorno-Karabakh region. It was built by orders of Bahman Mirza himself while he was alive. The mausoleum consisted of three big rooms. The first largest room at the entrance served as a ⁣⁣foyer⁣⁣, the second one served as a library and the third for the remains of Bahman Mirza Qajar. After the capture of Shusha by Armenian troops on May 8, 1992, the state of the Bahman Mirza Treasury remains unknown.

== See also ==
- Shusha State Historical and Architectural Reserve
- Vagif Mausoleum
- Nizami Mausoleum
- Caravanserai of Agha Gahraman Mirsiyab
- Yukhari Govhar Agha Mosque
- Ashaghi Govhar Agha Mosque
- Saatli Mosque
