= Govhar Agha Mosque =

Govhar Agha Mosque can refer to:

- Yukhari Govhar Agha Mosque, mosque in upper district of Shusha, Azerbaijan
- Ashaghi Govhar Agha Mosque, mosque in lower district of Shusha, Azerbaijan

== See also ==
- Religion in Azerbaijan
