= Caravansary of Safarov brothers =

- Azerbaijani: Səfərov qardaşlarının karvansarası
- Alternative names: Hotel of Safarov brothers

General information
- Location: Shusha, Azerbaijan, Azerbaijan
- Completed: The end of the XIX century

Technical details
- Floor count: 3

Caravansary of Safarov brothers (Azerbaijani: Səfərov qardaşlarının karvansarası) is a caravansary built in Shusha in the 19th century. It is located in Khoja Marjanlı neighborhood. The monument, which belongs to the 19th century, is considered a republican architectural monument of the Republic of Azerbaijan. After the occupation of the city of Shusha by the Armenian armed forces, the building of the caravanserai was destroyed. Currently, its ruins remain.

== Information ==
This famous caravanserai, known as the Safarov brothers' caravanserai, was actually built in the late 19th century by Haji Murtuza Safarov, a merchant from Shusha, in honor of his sons - Ahad, Samad, Mursal and Manaf. This caravanserai, named after the Safarov brothers, was the largest caravanserai in the city of Shusha at the time. In the construction of this caravanserai, the famous architect of Shusha, Karbalayi Safikhan Sultanhuseyn Karabakhi, played a big role. The right and left wings of the caravanserai consisted of two floors, and the central part consisted of three floors. The 1st floor was used for shops and workshops, and the 2nd and 3rd floors were used as a jewelry workshop, restaurant and hotel. The caravanserai consisted of its own yard, prayer rooms, and a special place for the horses of the visiting guests.

== Safarov brothers ==
Ahad, the eldest son of Murtuzan, was born in Shusha in 1895, studied at Shusha Real School and later graduated from Kyiv University, emigrated to Iran when the Bolsheviks occupied Azerbaijan and died in Iran in 1968. Samad, the second son of Haji Murtuza, was born in Shusha in 1897, received his first education at Shusha real school, and died before graduating from Kyiv University. Mursal, the third son of Haji Murtuzan, was born in Shusha in 1899, studied at Shusha real school and moved to Baku in the following years, graduated from the Pedagogical Institute, worked as a teacher of literature in schools No. 173 and 199 of Baku and died in Baku in 1961. Manaf, the fourth son of Haji Murtuzan, was born in the morning of Shusha in 1900, graduated from Shusha real school and was admitted to Kyiv University, but as a result of the Bolshevik occupation, he left his studies incomplete. Manaf also died mysteriously while emigrating to Iran.

== See also ==
- Khoja Marjanli Mosque

== Source ==
- Çingizoğlu, Ənvər Çingizoğlu (2012). Şuşa şəhəri:Təbrizli məhəlləsi. Ставрополь: Zərdabi LTD.
