= Mamayi Mosque =

Mosque in Shusha, Azerbaijan

- Azerbaijani: Mamay Məscidi; Arabic: مسجد ماماي
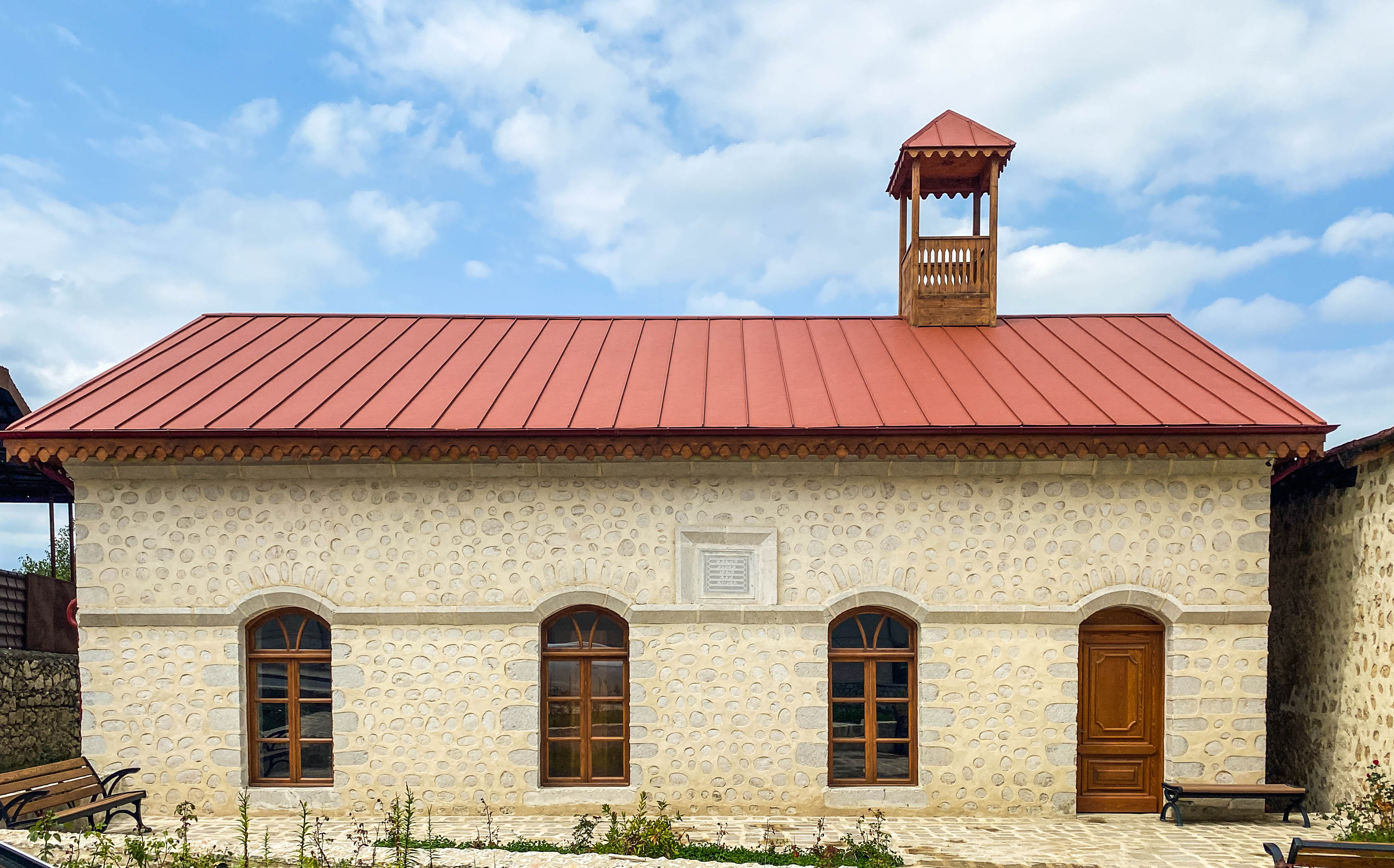
- The mosque in 2024

- Location of the mosque in Azerbaijan

Religion
- Affiliation: Shia Islam
- Ecclesiastical or organizational status: Mosque (19th century–1991); Profane use (1991–2020); Mosque (since 2020)
- Status: Active

Location
- Location: Shusha, Qusar District
- Country: Azerbaijan
- Interactive map of Mamayi Mosque
- Coordinates: 39°45′43″N 46°45′0″E

Architecture
- Type: Mosque architecture
- Style: Islamic
- Completed: 19th century
- Minaret: One

The Mamayi Mosque (Azerbaijani: Mamay Məscidi; Arabic: مسجد ماماي) is a Shia Islam mosque, located in Shusha, Azerbaijan, approximately 350 kilometres (220 mi) from Baku, the Azerbaijani capital.

== Overview ==
The mosque is located on G. Asgarov street in the Mamayi neighborhood of Shusha. Mamayi neighbourhood is the 4th of eight upper and earlier neighbourhoods of Shusha.

The Mamayi Mosque was one of the 17 mosques functioning in Shusha by the end of the 19th century. The mosque is located with the Shusha State Historical and Architectural Reserve.

== History ==
A few years before the occupation of Shusha, Mamayi Mosque along with Ashaghi Govhar Agha, Yukhari Govhar Agha and Saatli mosques were renovated. According to a satellite report by the Caucasus Heritage Watch of Cornell University, during the de facto Armenian control of the region, the mosque remained unchanged and well-preserved until 2020.

The mosque returned to Azerbaijani control following the 2020 three-day-long battle over Shusha.

== See also ==
- Shia Islam in Azerbaijan
- List of mosques in Azerbaijan
