= Seyidli Mosque =

Former mosque in Shusha, Azerbaijan

- Azerbaijani: Seyidli Məscidi
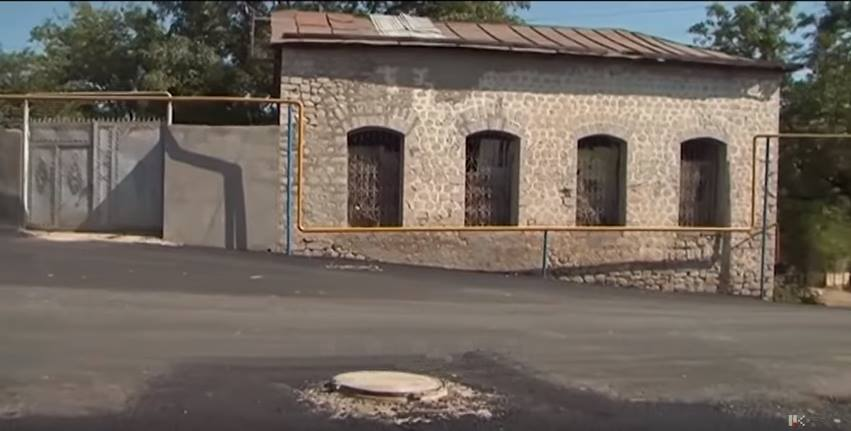
- The former mosque in 2017

- Location of the former mosque in Azerbaijan

Religion
- Affiliation: Shia Islam (former)
- Ecclesiastical or organizational status: Mosque (former)
- Status: Abandoned (partial ruinous state)

Location
- Location: Telman Street, 16, Shusha
- Country: Azerbaijan
- Interactive map of Seyidli Mosque
- Coordinates: 39°45′27″N 46°45′23″E

Architecture
- Type: Mosque architecture
- Established: 18th century

The Seyidli Mosque (Azerbaijani: Seyidli Məscidi) was a former Shia Islam mosque, now in partial ruins, located in Shusha, Azerbaijan, approximately 350 km (220 mi) from Baku, the Azerbaijani capital. The former mosque is located on intersection of Telman and Garyaghdyogly streets.

== Overview ==
The former mosque is located in Seyidli neighborhood, at the intersection of Telman and Garyagdioglu streets in Shusha city. The Seyidli Mosque is believed to have been built in the 18th century. According to a satellite investigation done by the Caucasus Heritage Watch of Cornell University, during the 30 years of de-facto Armenian control under the Republic of Artsakh, the mosque remained unchanged from the Soviet period and well-preserved.

== Architecture ==
The small neighborhood mosque, built over two floors, is almost indistinguishable from other mosques in its current state and resembles local residential properties. The prayer hall of the mosque, which has a rectangular shape, does not have a three-bay division like the Mamayi or Saatli mosques.

== See also ==
- Shia Islam in Azerbaijan
- List of mosques in Azerbaijan
