= Azerbaijan State Museum of History of Karabakh =

Museum in Shusha district, Azerbaijan

- Azerbaijani: Azərbaycan Dövlət Qarabağ Tarixi Muzeyi
- Established: February 1991
- Location: Shusha, Azerbaijan
- Collection size: 550
- Director: Emin Aghayev

Azerbaijan State Museum of History of Karabakh (Azerbaijani: Azərbaycan Dövlət Qarabağ Tarixi Muzeyi) was a museum located in Shusha, Azerbaijan.

== History ==
In February 1991, by the order of the Minister of Culture of the Republic of Azerbaijan, Polad Bulbuloglu, the Museum of History of Karabakh was established in Shusha. Up to 550 exhibit funds were created at the preparatory stage and staff schedule was approved.

Originally, the house of Firidun bey Kocharli was used as the base for the museum. Later the museum was temporarily operated in one of the buildings in the Resort Sanatorium Union. The political situation and the Armenian occupation resulted in the suspension of the museum's activity.

As a result of the occupation of Shusha by the Armenian Armed Forces about six hundred exhibits of the museum were destroyed and those could be carried were transported.

Later, when a group of Shusha intellectuals made suggestions for the restoration of the museum, the proposal was ignored. However, the approval of the relevant agencies on whether locating the museum in an empty building at the Alley of Martyrs or in ancient buildings located on top of other tourist routes for its activity was not obtained. At present, wages for museum employees are frozen.

The first director of the State Museum of History of Karabakh was Emin Aghayev.

== See also ==
- Monuments of Shusha
- List of museums in Azerbaijan
