= Khoja Marjanly's Spring =

Historical fresh water spring

- Azerbaijani: Xoca Mərcanlı bulağı
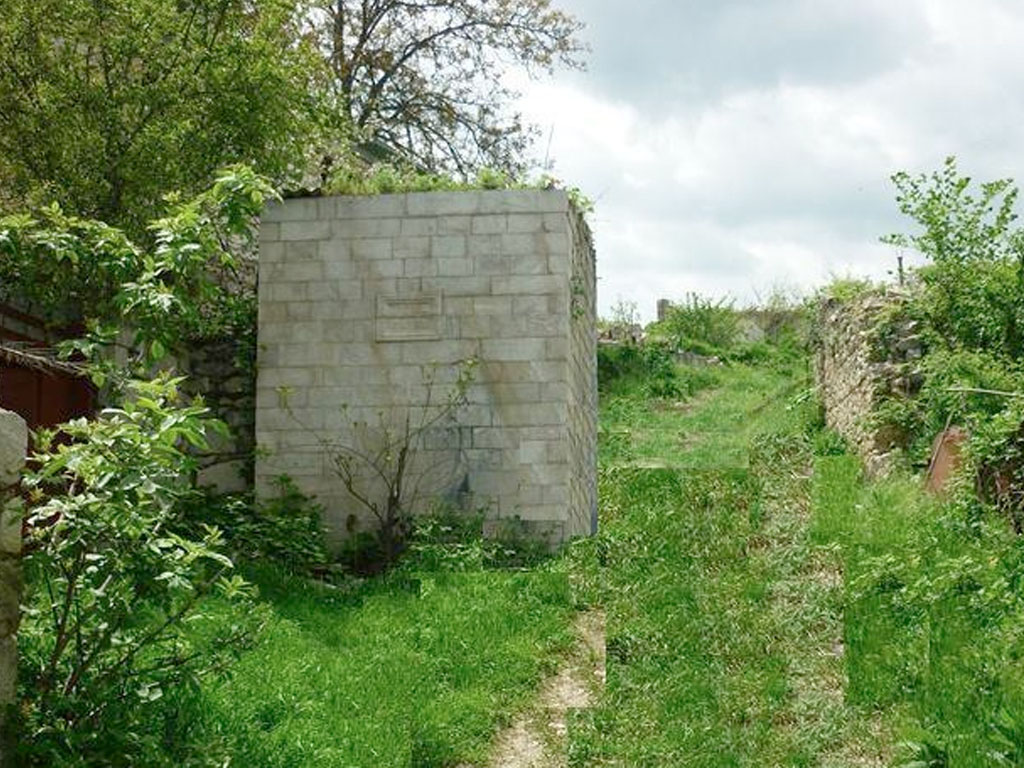
- Interactive map of Khoja Marjanly's Spring
- Location: Azerbaijan, Shusha, Mir Mohsun Navvab Str.
- Type: Spring
- Completion date: 18th century

Khoja Marjanly's Spring (Azerbaijani: Xoca Mərcanlı bulağı) is a historical spring located in the city of Shusha, Nagorno-Karabakh, in the Khoja Marjanly neighbourhood, near the mosque with the same name. It was built in the 18th century. Since the occupation of Shusha by the Armenian forces on 8 May 1992, the spring was in a neglected state and eventually dried up.

== History ==
Shusha, founded in the 18th century, was divided into 17 mehelles (neighbourhoods). Each of them had its own mosque, church, spring and hammam (bath). The history of one of these quarters, Khoja Marjanly, coincides with the history of the city. The Mehelle Khoja Marjanly belongs to the upper mehelles and is located in the centre of the city of Shusha. When the neighbourhood was laid, a spring was also built here along with the mosque. After the occupation of Shusha by the Armenian forces in 1992, the spring was in a neglected state, the mosque and other buildings of the neighbourhood were destroyed. Subsequently, the spring dried up.

== See also ==
- Khoja Marjanli Mosque
