= Mardinli Mosque =

Former mosque in Shusha, Azerbaijan

- Azerbaijani: Mərdinli Məscidi; Arabic: مسجد ماردينلي; Persian: مسجد تازه محل
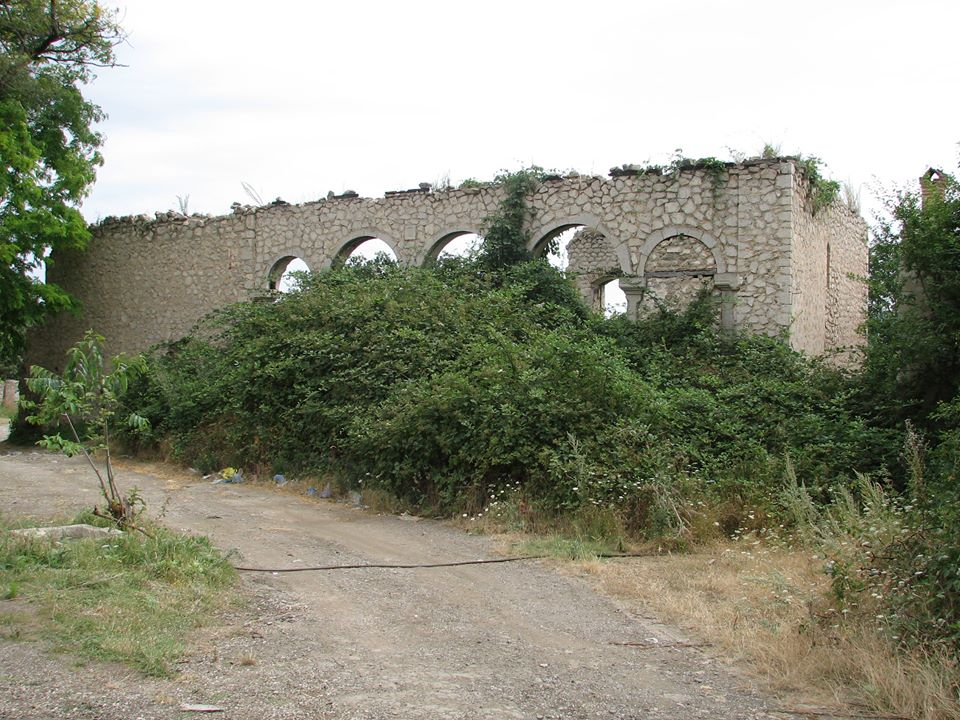
- Ruins of the former mosque in 2014

- Location of the former mosque in Azerbaijan

Religion
- Affiliation: Shia Islam (former)
- Ecclesiastical or organizational status: Mosque
- Status: Abandoned (ruinous state)

Location
- Location: Shusha, Karabakh
- Country: Azerbaijan
- Interactive map of Mardinli Mosque
- Coordinates: 39°45′44.1677″N 46°45′10.8731″E

Architecture
- Type: Mosque architecture
- Established: 19th century

The Mardinli Mosque (Azerbaijani: Mərdinli məscidi; Persian: مسجد تازه محل; Arabic: مسجد ماردينلي) is a former Shia Muslim mosque, now in ruins, located in Shusha, in the Karabakh region in Azerbaijan.

The former mosque is located on intersection of Sadigjan and Garasherov streets of the Mardinli neighborhood of Shusha. The Mardinli neighbourhood is one of eight upper and earlier neighbourhoods of Shusha. The Mardinli Mosque was one of seventeen mosques functioning in Shusha by the end of the 19th century. The former Mardinli Mosque is located in the UNESCO World Heritage-listed Shusha State Historical and Architectural Reserve.

== See also ==
- Shia Islam in Azerbaijan
- List of mosques in Azerbaijan
