= Saatli Mosque =

Mosque in Shusha, Azerbaijan

- Azerbaijani: Saatlı Məscidi
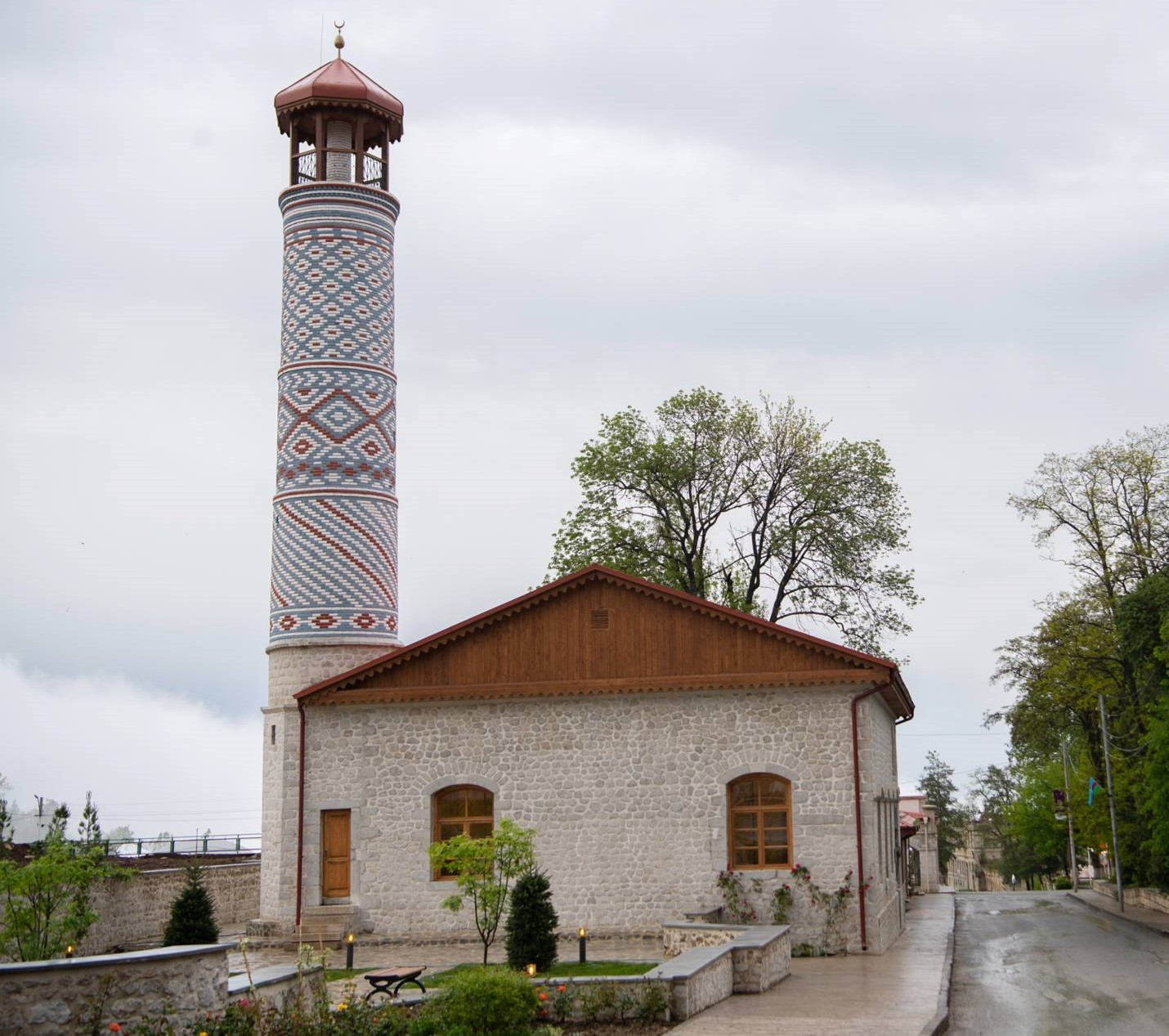
- The mosque façade in 2023, after restoration

- Location of the mosque in Azerbaijan

Religion
- Affiliation: Islam
- Ecclesiastical or organisational status: Mosque
- Status: Active

Location
- Location: Shusha
- Country: Azerbaijan
- Coordinates: 39°45′46″N 46°45′04″E

Architecture
- Architect: Karbalayi Safikhan Karabakhi
- Type: Mosque architecture
- Completed: 1883

Specifications
- Minaret: 2 (one destroyed)
- Materials: Stone; brick

The Saatli Mosque (Azerbaijani: Saatlı Məscidi) is a mosque located in Shusha, Azerbaijan.

Shusha was under control of Armenian forces from the capture of Shusha on May 8, 1992, until the city's recapture by Azerbaijan on 8 November 2020.

== History ==
The Saatli Mosque was built in 1883 in the Saatli neighbourhood of Shusha. It was designed by prominent Azerbaijani architect Karbalayi Safikhan Karabakhi, and follow the design of earlier mosques of Shusha, including the Yukhari Govhar Agha Mosque, Ashaghi Govhar Agha Mosque and the Agdam Mosque in Aghdam. The Saatli Mosque is considered one of the final masterpieces of Karabakhi, built with two minarets. The mosque has a three-naved prayer hall and brick minaret with especially patterned decoration specific to architecture of Karabakh.

== Gallery ==
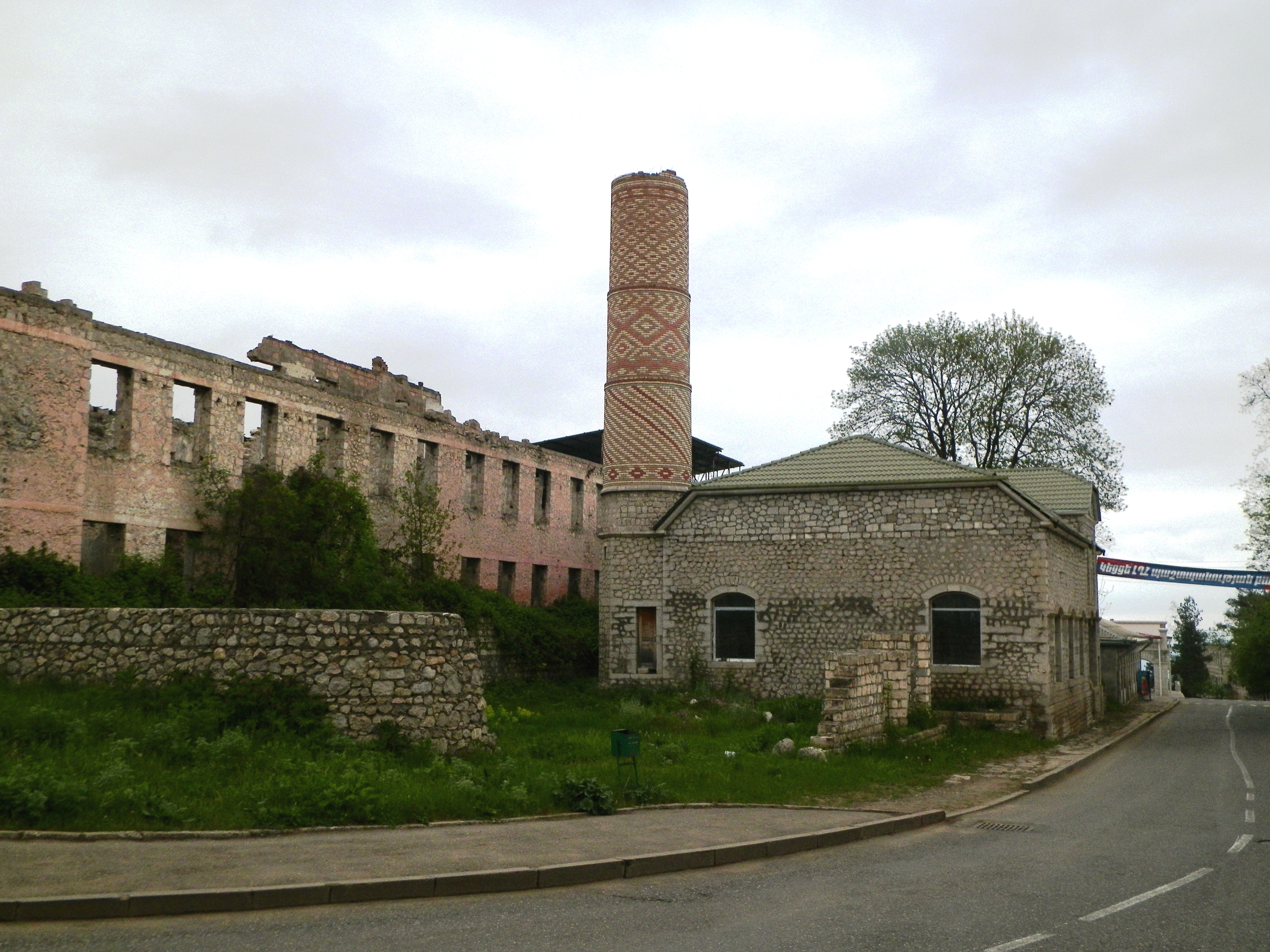
The mosque during Armenian control of the city

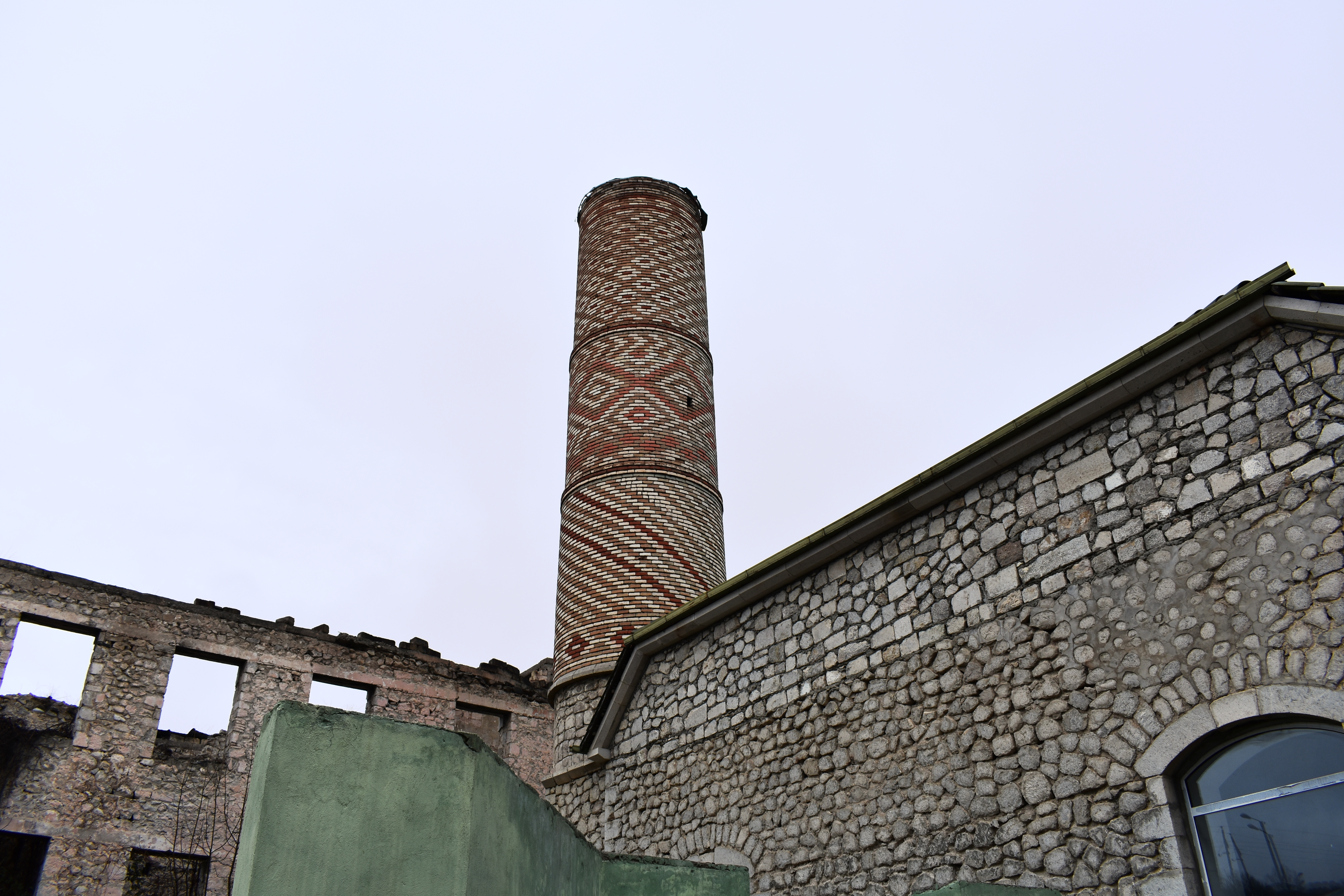
The exterior, in 2018, prior to restoration

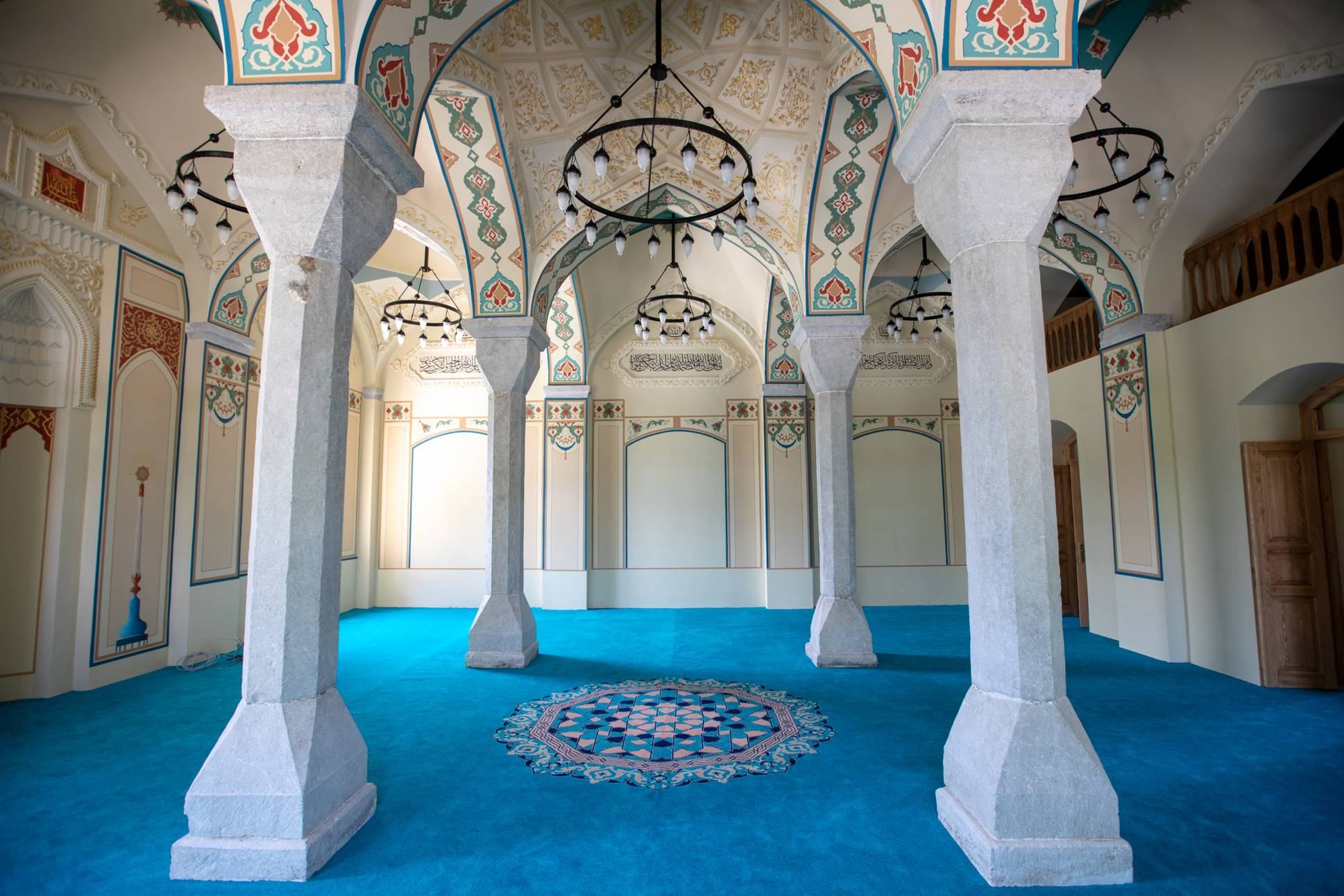
The interior, in 2023, following restoration

== See also ==
- Islam in Azerbaijan
- List of mosques in Azerbaijan
