= Guyulug Mosque =

Mosque in Shusha, Azerbaijan

- Azerbaijani: Quyuluq məscidi Persian: مسجد گویولق
- Location of the mosque in Azerbaijan

Religion
- Affiliation: Shia Islam
- Ecclesiastical or organisational status: Mosque
- Status: Active

Location
- Location: Shusha
- Country: Azerbaijan
- Coordinates: 39°27′06″N 46°45′06″E

Architecture
- Type: Mosque architecture
- Style: Islamic
- Completed: 18th century
- Minaret: Two

The Guyulug Mosque (Azerbaijani: Quyuluq məscidi, Persian: مسجد گویولق) is a Shia Islam mosque located in Shusha, Azerbaijan. The mosque is located on Ojaggulu street of Guyulug neighborhood of Shusha.

== Architecture ==
The Guyulug Mosque was one of the seventeen mosques functioning in Shusha by the end of the 19th century. As of 2007, the exact state of the mosque was unknown.

According to the architectural composition of the main façade, the Guyulug Mosque belonged to the type of Shusha quarter mosques with an eyvan with wide arches of various shapes, which constituted an organic whole with a prayer hall. According to the architectural and constructive solution of the internal space, the mosque belonged to the type of Shusha quarter mosques with a single volume and a flat wooden ceiling. In the mosque, as in other district mosques of the city, in the depths of the prayer hall, opposite the mihrab, on the second tier, a small open gallery was provided, framed by three lancet arches. This gallery was intended for women.

== History ==
The Guyulug Mosque is registered as an 18th-century architectural monument of local importance, under inventory number 5146. Quyuluq was one of Shusha's lower neighbourhoods, alongside Seyidli, Julfalar, Chukhur and Haji Yusifli, while quarters such as Saatli, Kocharli and Mamayi lay in the upper town. Shusha came under Armenian control in May and was retaken by Azerbaijan on 8 November 2020.

According to the Shusha State Historical and Architectural Reserve, the mosque was neglected for many years after the occupation began and was severely damaged during those years. A Caucasus Heritage Watch satellite study of Azerbaijani heritage under Armenian control found that some of Shusha's neighbourhood mosques, including Taza Mahalla and Saatli, were renovated for other uses during that period. The Saatli Mosque reopened in May 2023 after restoration by the Heydar Aliyev Foundation.

== See also ==
- Shia Islam in Azerbaijan
- List of mosques in Azerbaijan
