= Shusha Realni School =

- Şuşa Realnı Məktəbi; Շուշիի ռեալական դպրոց
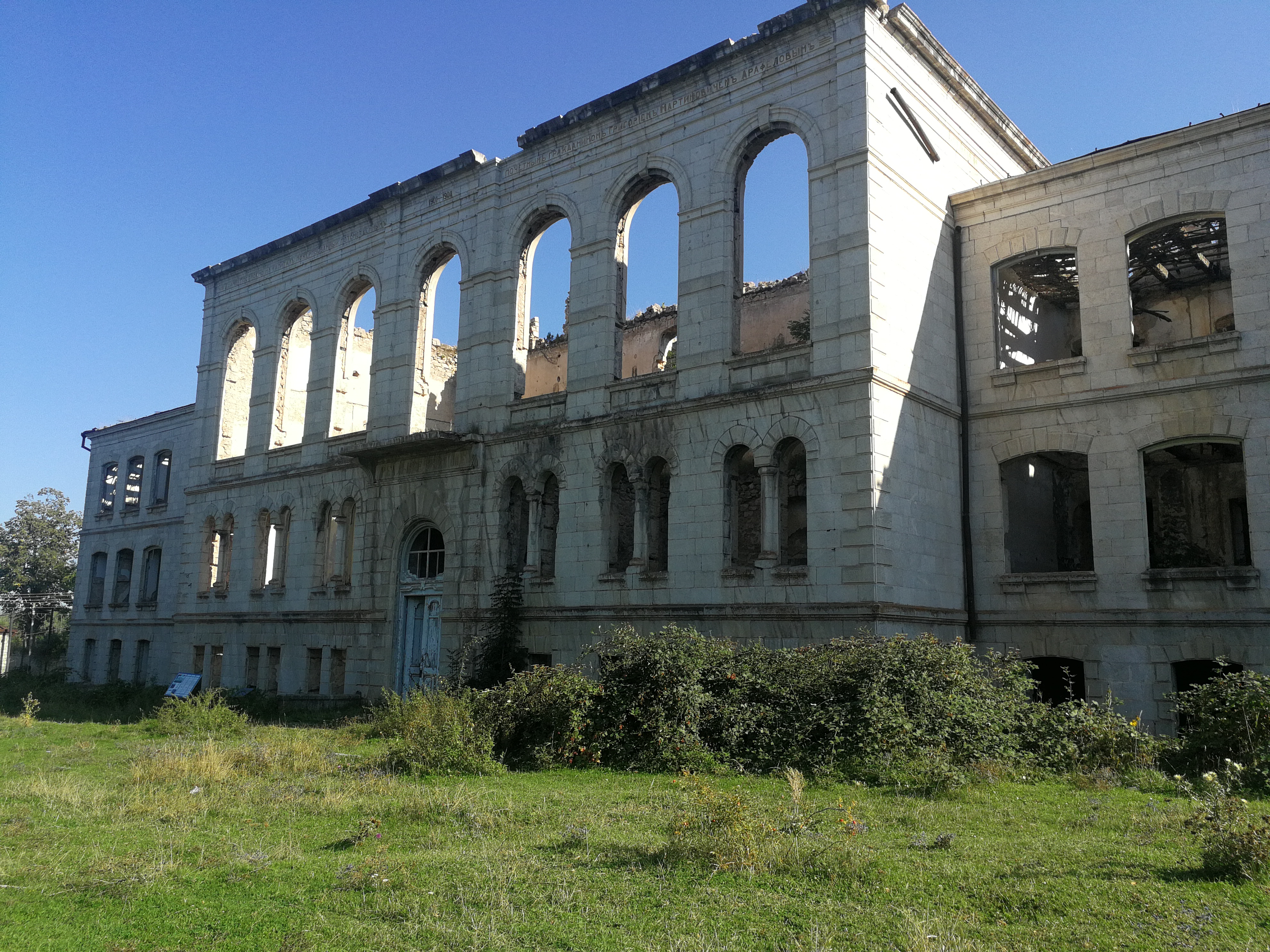
- Ruined state of the Shusha Realni School
- Interactive map of the Shusha Realni School area

General information
- Type: School
- Location: Shusha, Azerbaijan
- Completed: 1881
- Demolished: 1992

Shusha Realni School (Russian: Шушинское реальное училище; Azerbaijani: Şuşa real məktəbi; Armenian: Շուշիի ռեալական դպրոց) was a school with six classes, located in Shusha, Azerbaijan, in the disputed region of Nagorno-Karabakh. The school's building phase was completed in 1881. The school stopped its work following the capture of Shusha by Armenian forces in 1992 and now lies in a ruined state.

== History ==
=== Establishment ===
In the 19th century, new types of schools began to appear in the region that makes up modern-day Armenia and Azerbaijan. During this period, there was only one main school in Baku, and one classical gymnasium in Ganja. This changed after the demand for education in the region grew, two schools were no longer sufficient thus prompting the population of the city to appeal to the Petersburg-Caucasian committee. The appeal stated:

"Ganja governor requests to open a sixth-grade real school in Shusha city, based on the willingness and demand of the residents to study (Studying more than 400 students at City School reaffirms this initiative once more) and the desire of the city community. The city community is committed to providing the school with the appropriate building and helping with 7500 manats a year. "

The efforts of the local population led to the foundation of the school in Shusha on September 20, 1881. After the first years of the school's opening, 159 pupils were enrolled in the school, consisting of preparatory classes and three main classes, 58 of the students were Azerbaijani, 91 were Armenian, whilst the other 10 were students from other nationalities. In 1886, 7,500 manats were spent on the school.

=== 19th and 20th centuries ===
In 1890, a representative of the Caucasian Ministry of education brought Ziadovla Anishiravan, Mirza Qajar, and anthropologist Shantr. This arrival piqued the interest of the students, which lowered the percentage of absence at the school to 7.64%. In 1890, contrary to the Tbilisi schools, German was not forced upon the students, but the choice to learn it was made available.

=== Current status ===
The state of the school has steadily deteriorated following the capture of Shusha by Armenian forces in 1992. It currently lies in a ruined state.

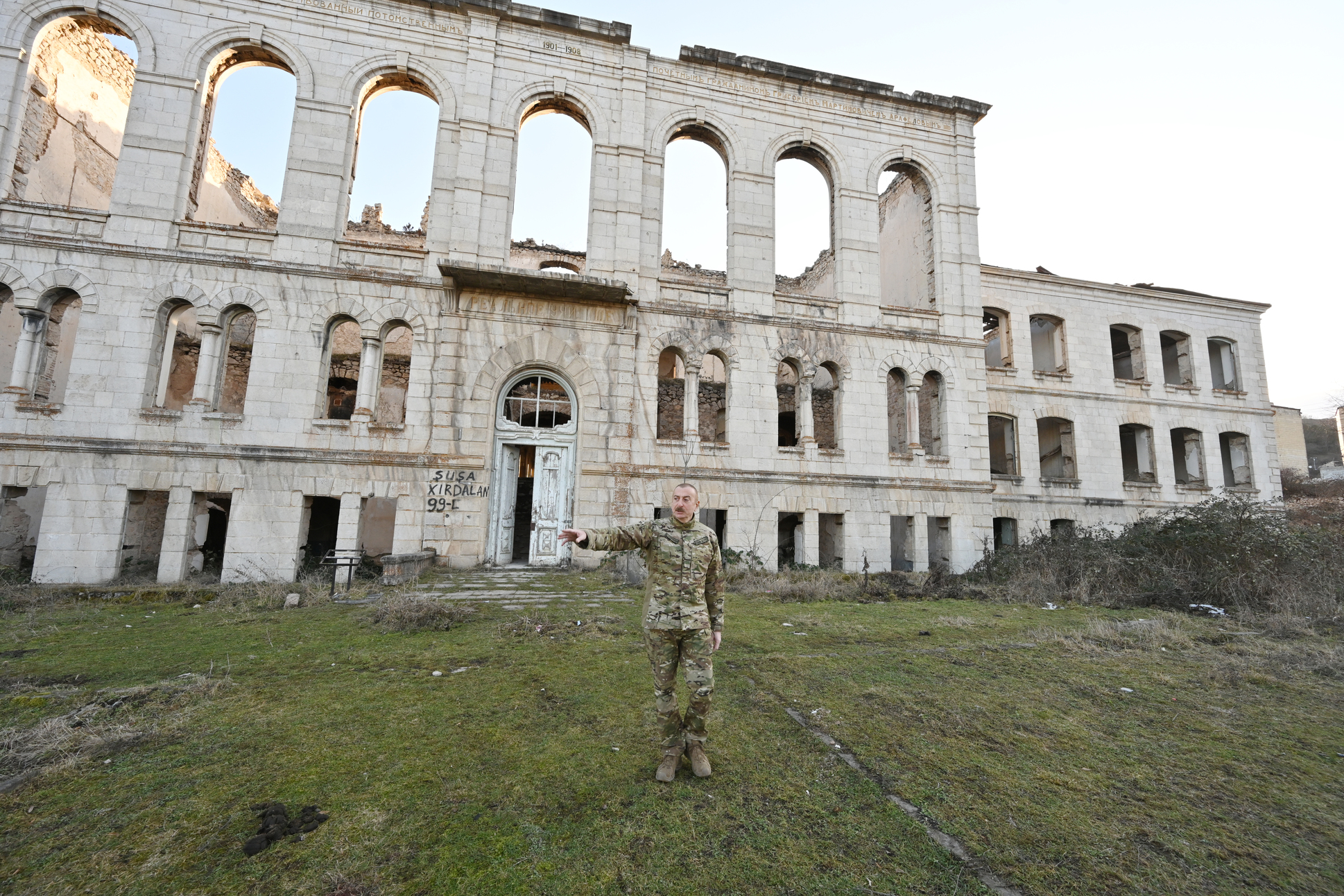
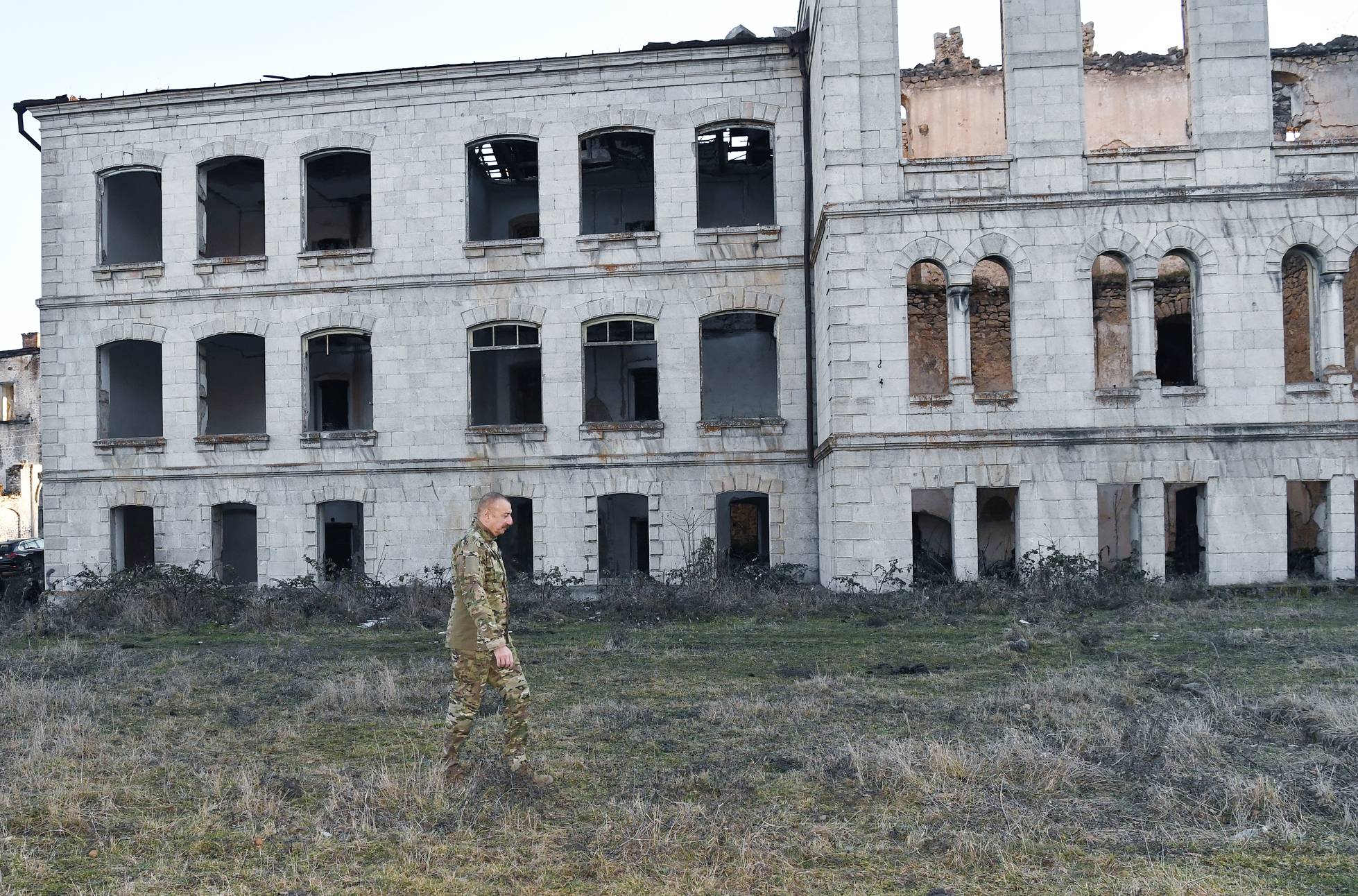
Azerbaijani president, Ilham Aliyev in front of the ruined Shusha Realni School

== Gallery ==
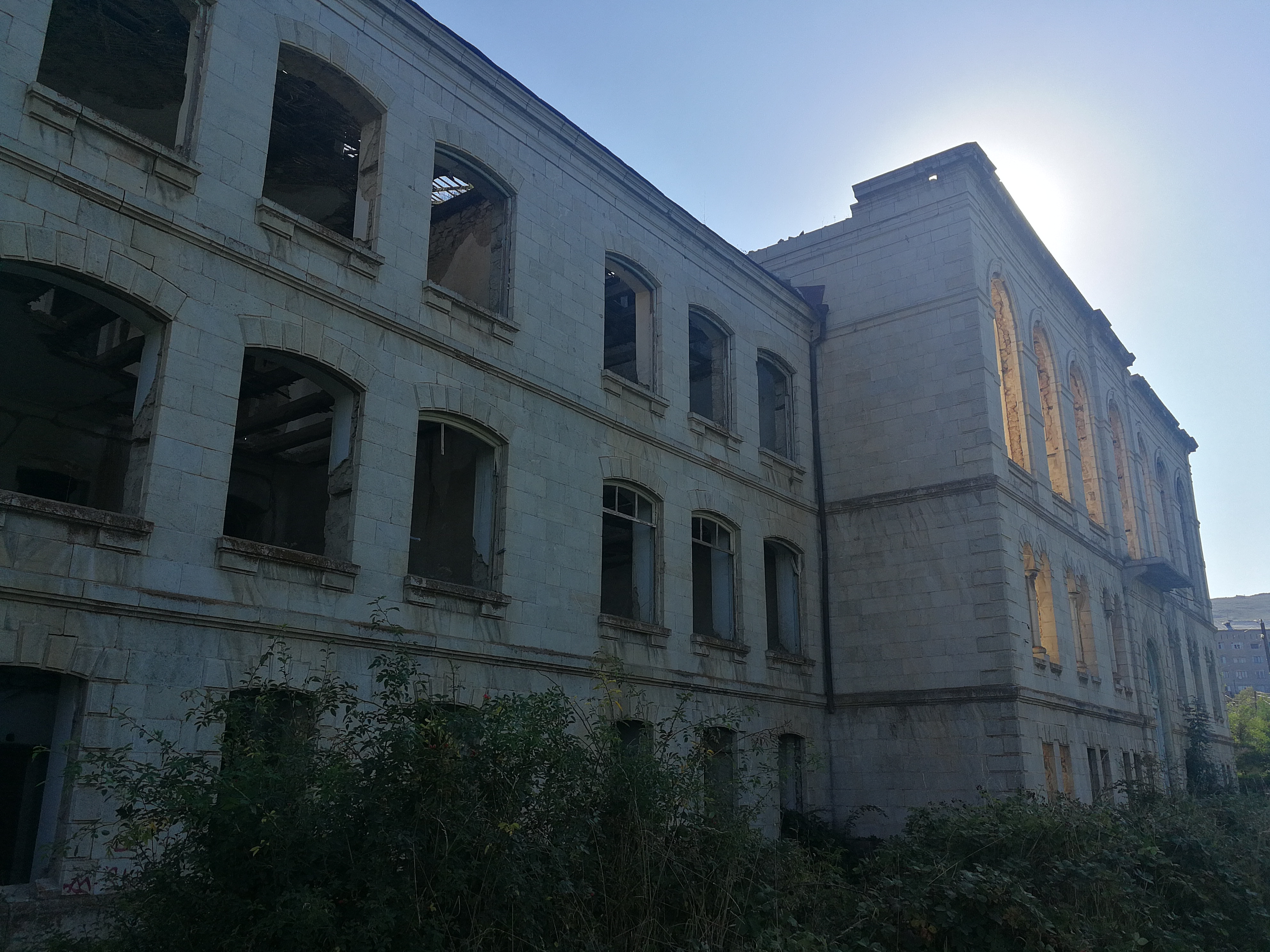
Side view of the school

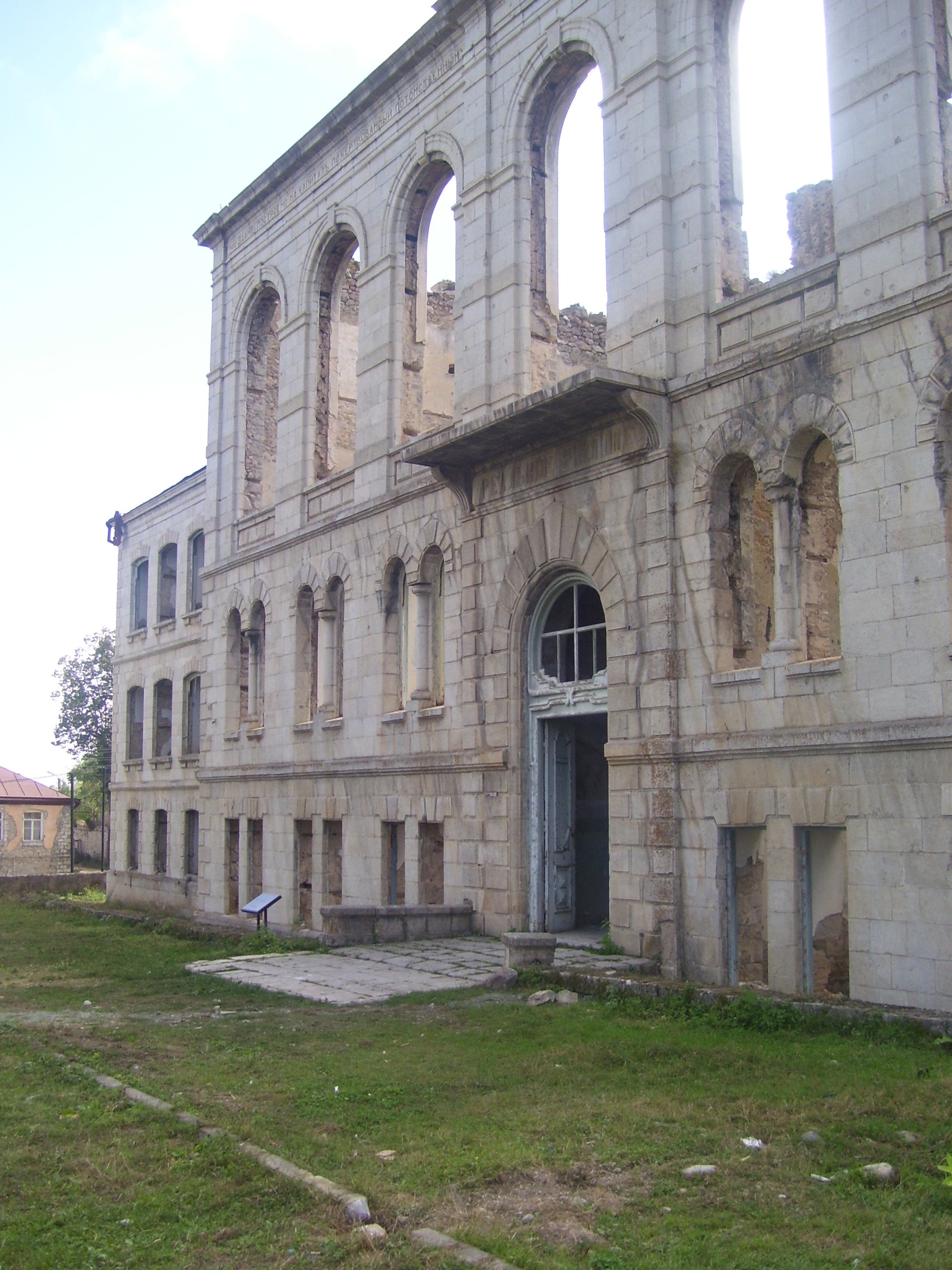

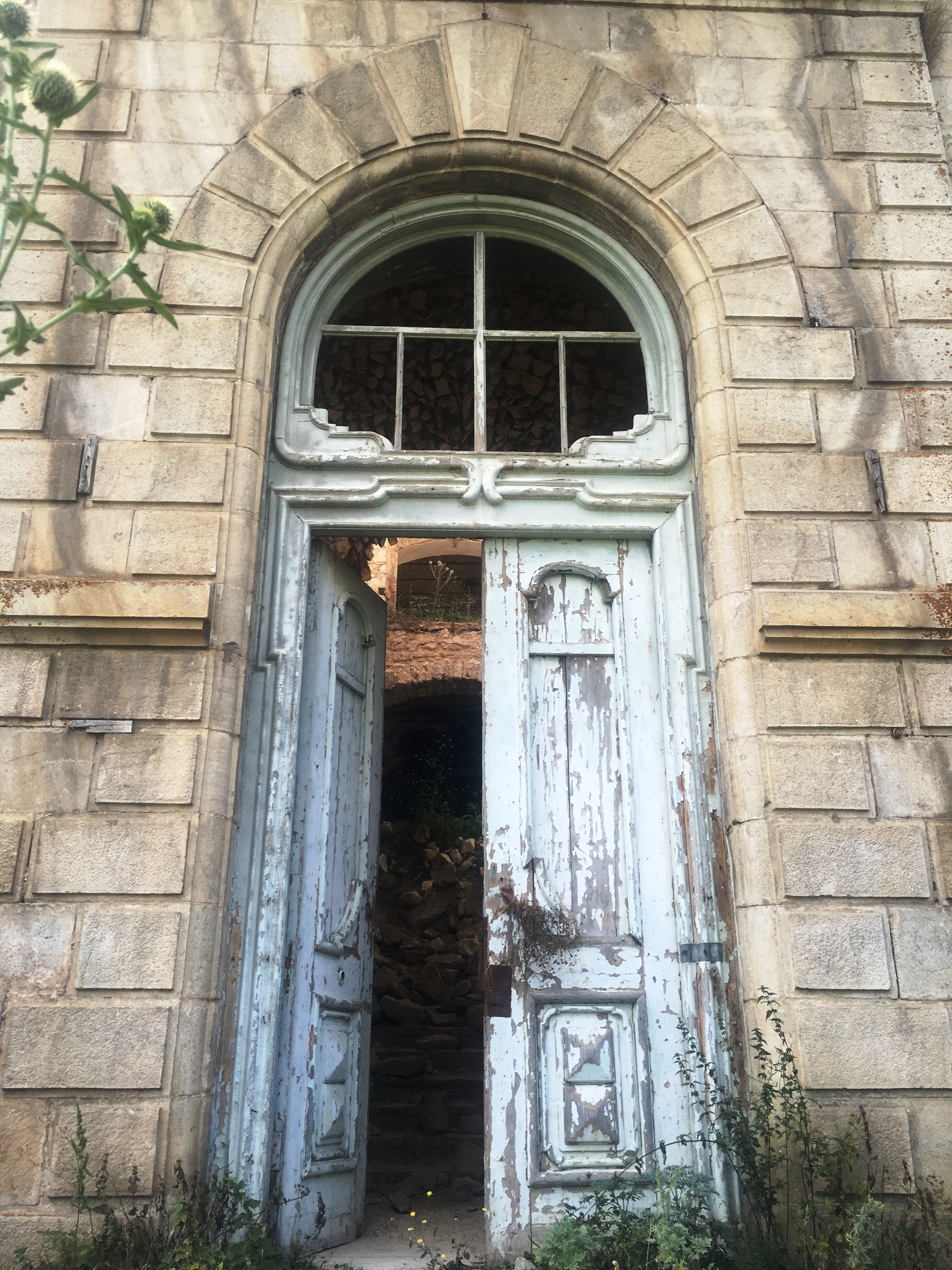
Entrance of the school

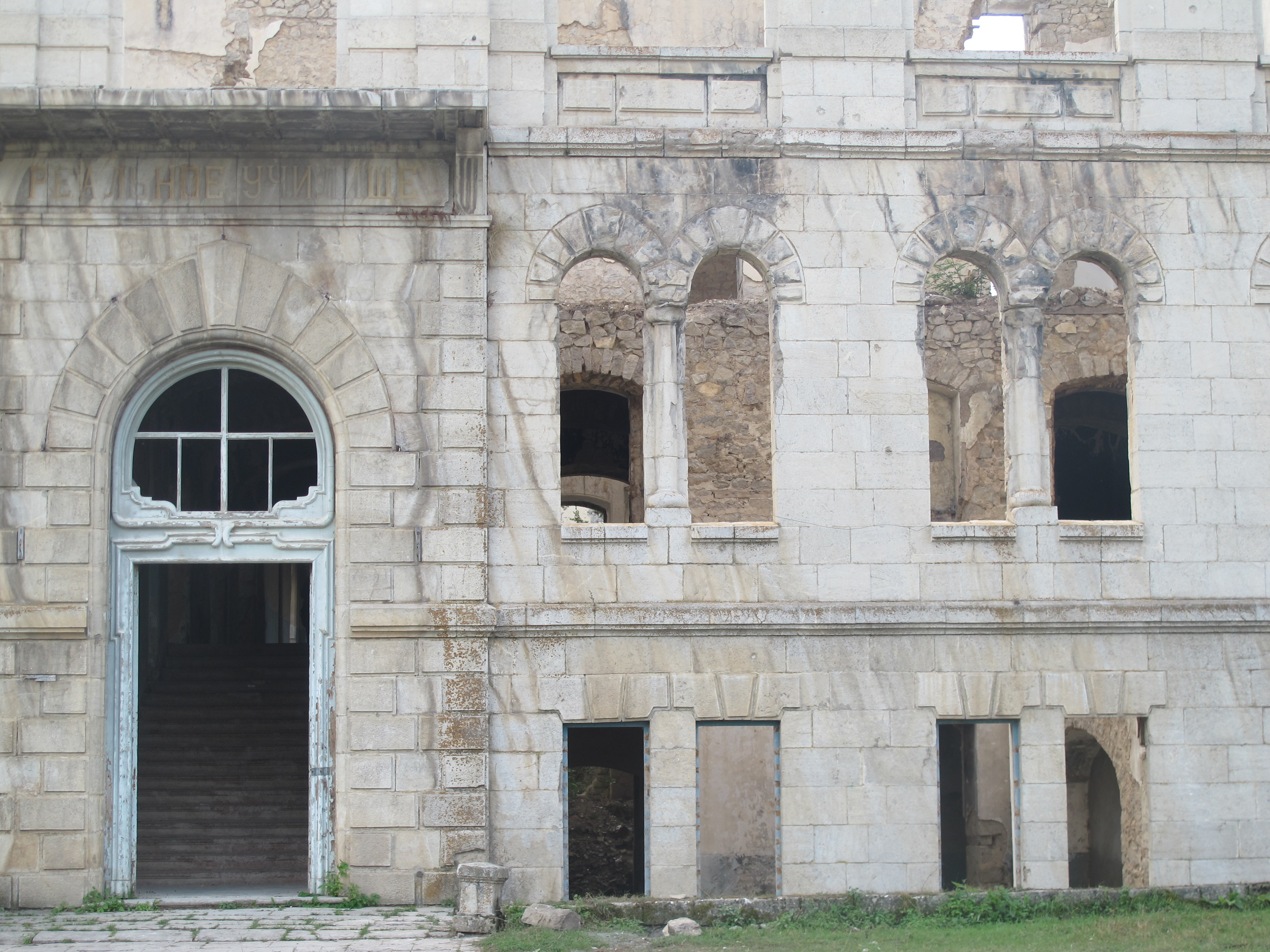
Front view of the school

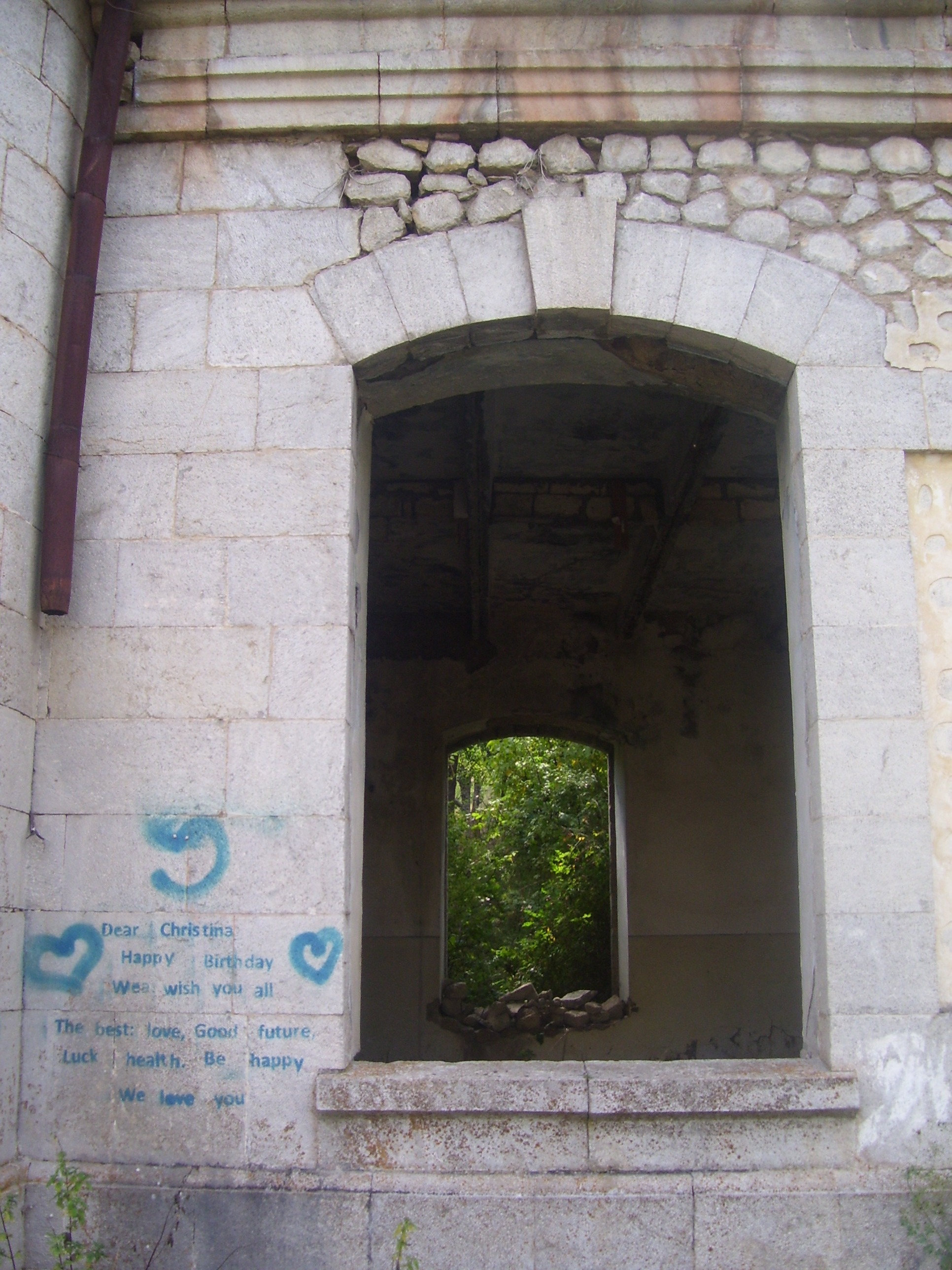
Vandalized walls of the school

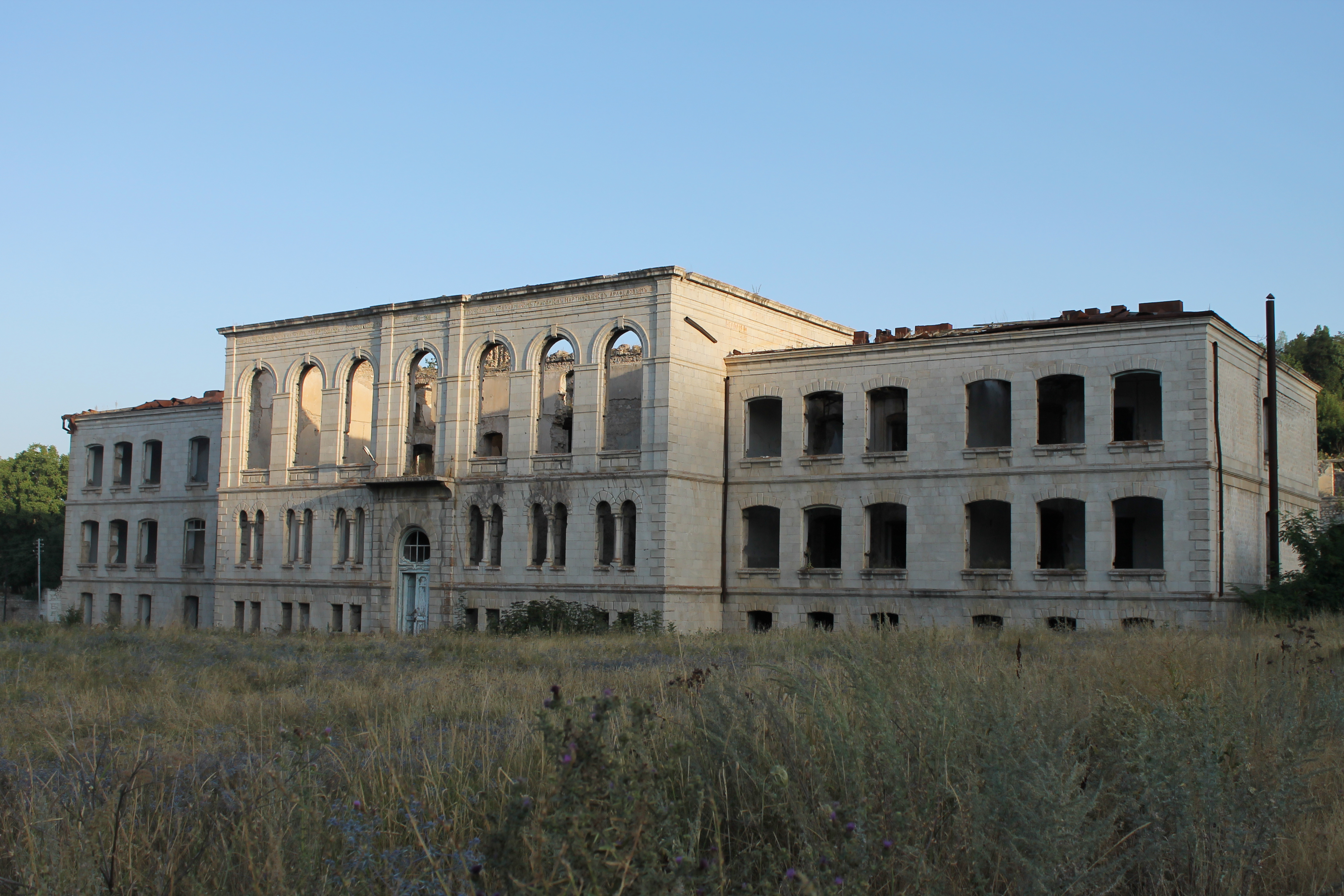
General view of the school

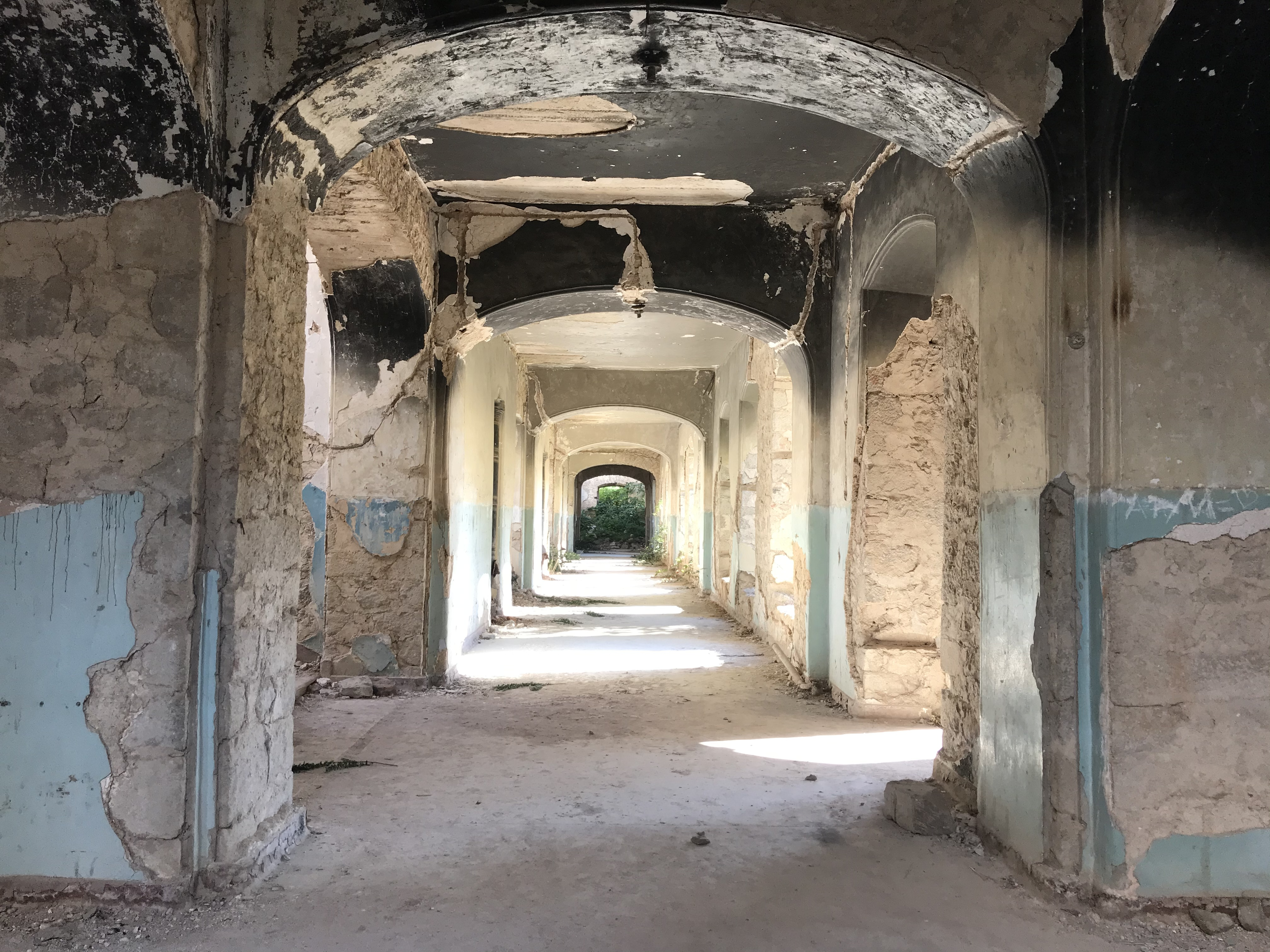
Inside the school

== See also ==
- Monuments of Shusha
