= Khoja Marjanli Mosque =

Former mosque in Shusha, Azerbaijan

- Azerbaijani: Xoca Mərcanlı məscidi Persian: مسجد خواجه مرجانلی
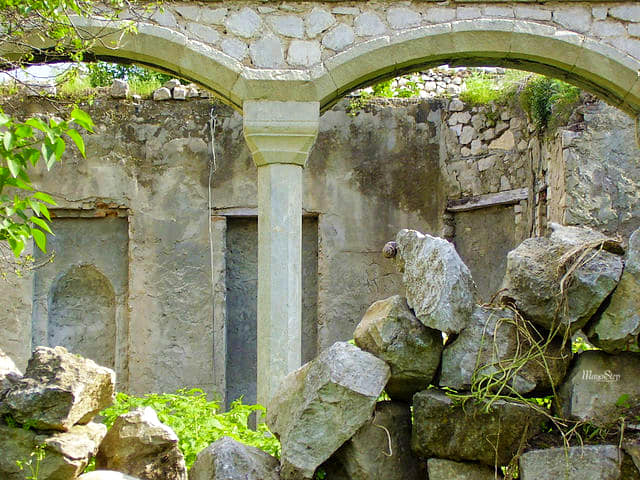
- Ruins of the former mosque in 2013

- Location of the former mosque in Azerbaijan

Religion
- Affiliation: Shia Islam (former)
- Ecclesiastical or organizational status: Mosque (19th century–1992)
- Status: Abandoned (ruinous state)

Location
- Location: Mirza Alakbar Sabir street, Khoja Marjanli, Shusha, Karabakh
- Country: Azerbaijan
- Interactive map of Khoja Marjanli Mosque
- Coordinates: 39°45′36″N 46°45′5″E

Architecture
- Type: Mosque architecture
- Style: Islamic
- Completed: 18th century

The Khoja Marjanli Mosque (Azerbaijani: Xoca Mərcanlı Məscidi, Persian: مسجد خواجه مرجانلی) was a former Shia Islam mosque, now in ruins, located in Shusha, in the Karabakh region. It is located on the Mirza Alakbar Sabir street of the Khoja Marjanli neighborhood of Shusha.

Shusha was part of the Nagorno-Karabakh Autonomous Oblast, and came under control of local Armenian forces on May 8, 1992. During the period of occupation, the mosque was abandoned and desecrated. On 8 November 2020, Azerbaijani forces conquered the city during the 2020 Nagorno-Karabakh War following a three-day long battle.

== See also ==
- Shia Islam in Azerbaijan
- List of mosques in Azerbaijan
- Khoja Marjanly's Spring
- Caravansary of Safarov brothers
