= Karbalayi Safikhan Karabakhi =

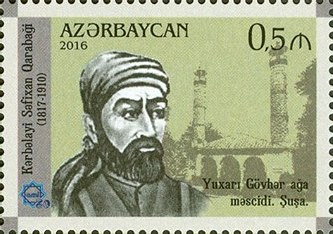
- Stamp of Azerbaijan, dedicated to the 80th Anniversary of the Union of Architects of Azerbaijan
- Born: 1817; Shusha, Karabakh Khanate, Russian Empire
- Died: 25 June 1910 (aged 93); Shusha, Elisabethpol Governorate, Russian Empire
- Occupation: Architect
- Buildings: Ashaghi Govhar Agha Mosque Agdam Mosque Yukhari Govhar Agha Mosque

Karbalayi Safikhan Sultanhuseyn oghlu Karabakhi (Note: Also transliterated Kerabalai Sefi Khan Karabagi and Kerbalai Sefikhan Karabagi.) (Azerbaijani: Kərbəlayı Səfixan Sultanhüseyn oğlu Qarabaği; Arabic: کربلایی صفی‌خان سلطانحسین وغلی قاراباغی, c. 1817–1910) was an Azerbaijani architect. He was a practitioner of the Karabakh school of architecture, who incorporated traditional and romantic elements into his works. In Karabakhi's designs, such as the mosques at Aghdam and Barda, elements drawn from Azerbaijani architectural traditions are apparent.

== Works ==
A characteristic feature of the creativity of Karabakhi was the rational and skilful use of traditional local architecture. On the socket of Yukhari Govhar Agha Mosque built by him in 1883, is written in Arabic: "Made by Karbalayi Safikhan Karabakhi. 1301."

The constructed projects by Karabakhi include a mausoleum in Barda (1868), the Agdam Mosque, the Tatar Mosque (1870) in Odessa, the Mosque Qarabaghlar in Ashgabat and other civic buildings in Nagorno-Karabakh region.

He created a novel type of mosque in the Nagorno-Karabakh region, with a unique organization of internal space: the division of stone columns on the two-story gallery and the use of domed ceilings.
