= Ashaghi Govhar Agha Mosque =

Mosque in Shusha, Azerbaijan

- Azerbaijani: Aşağı Gövhər ağa məscidi
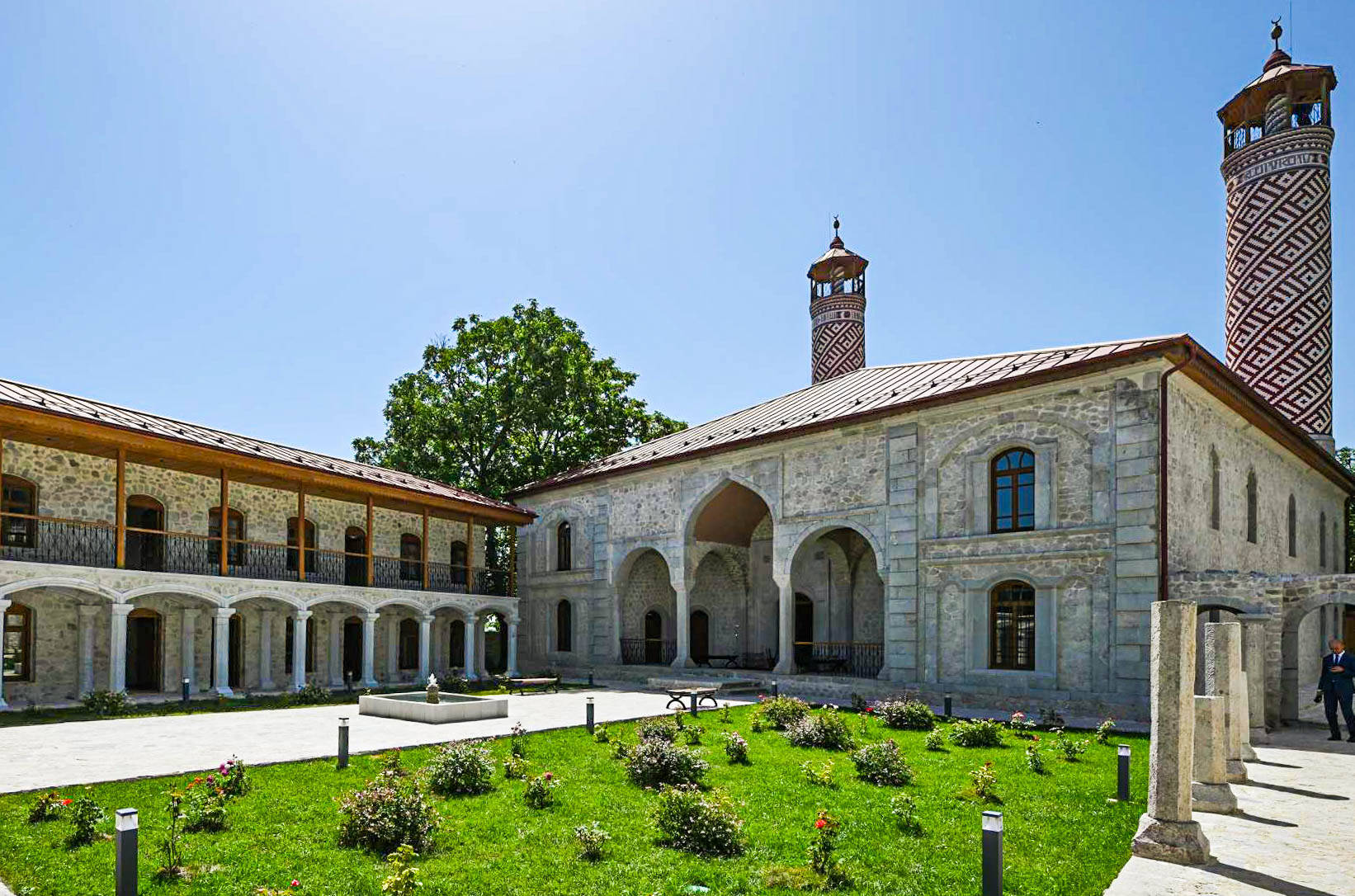
- The mosque, in 2024, after restoration

- Location of the mosque in Azerbaijan

Religion
- Affiliation: Islam
- Ecclesiastical or organisational status: Mosque
- Status: Active

Location
- Location: Shusha
- Country: Azerbaijan
- Coordinates: 39°45′43″N 46°45′13″E

Architecture
- Architect: Karbalayi Safikhan Karabakhi
- Type: Mosque architecture
- Style: Islamic architecture
- Completed: 1875-1876

Specifications
- Dome: Four (maybe more)
- Minaret: Two

The Ashaghi Govhar Agha Mosque (Azerbaijani: Aşağı Gövhər ağa məscidi, lit. 'Lower Govhar Agha Mosque') is a mosque in Shusha, Azerbaijan.

The designation ashaghi ("lower") refers to the location of the mosque in the lower section of Shusha town, distinguishing it from the Yukhari Govhar Agha Mosque, the similarly named mosque located in the upper section of the town.

== History ==
Construction of Ashaghi Govhar Agha Mosque was completed with orders from Govhar Agha, daughter of Ibrahim Khalil Khan of Karabakh Khanate approximately eight years before the Yukhari Govhar Agha Mosque was built. A difference between the Ashaghi Govhar Agha and Yukhari Govhar Agha is that the minarets of the former are located at the corners of the rear façade and the minarets of the Yukhari Govhar Agha Mosque are on the front façade.

Seriously damaged as a result of heavy shelling by Armenian armoured units during the occupation of Shusha, the mosque was desecrated. During the existence of the Republic of Artsakh, as of 2005–2007, the mosque was reportedly in a semi-destroyed state. Although it has been claimed that the mosque was renovated, members of an Azerbaijani delegation visiting Karabakh took photos and claimed that the mosque is still badly damaged, and no renovation works are being done.

Restoration of the mosque was completed in 2024, funded with the support of the Heydar Aliyev Foundation.

== Gallery ==
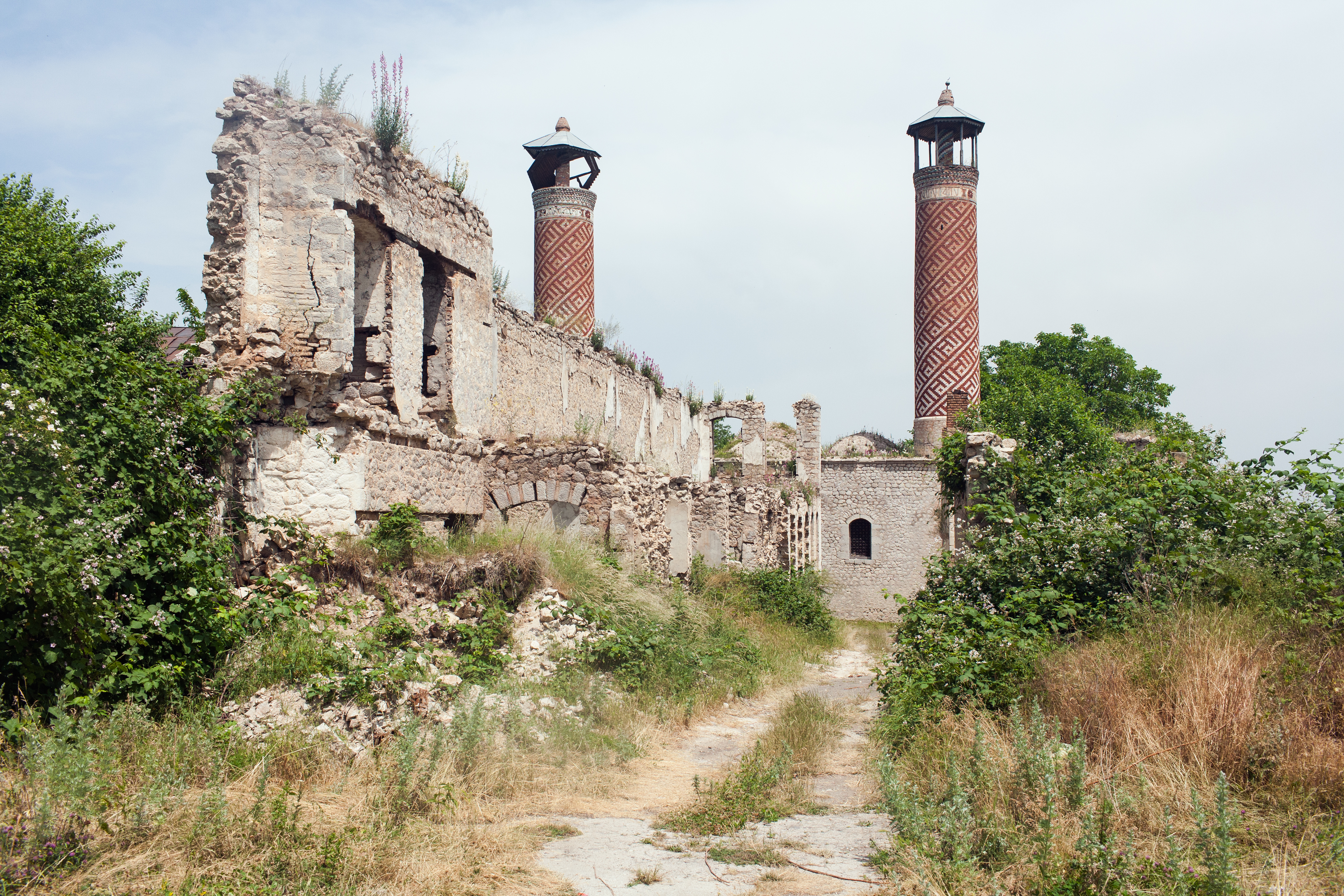
The mosque in 2010

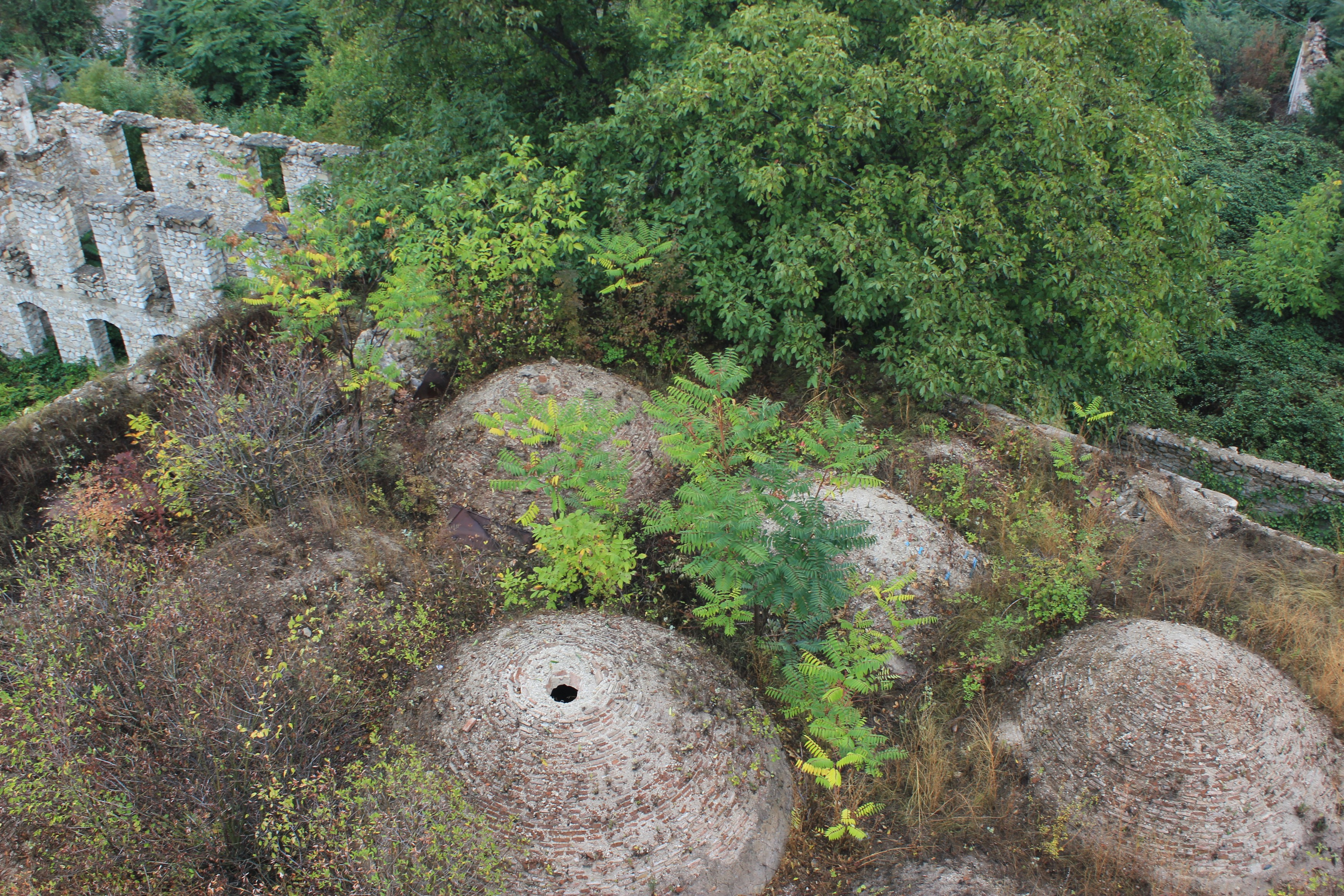
The mosque roof in 2017

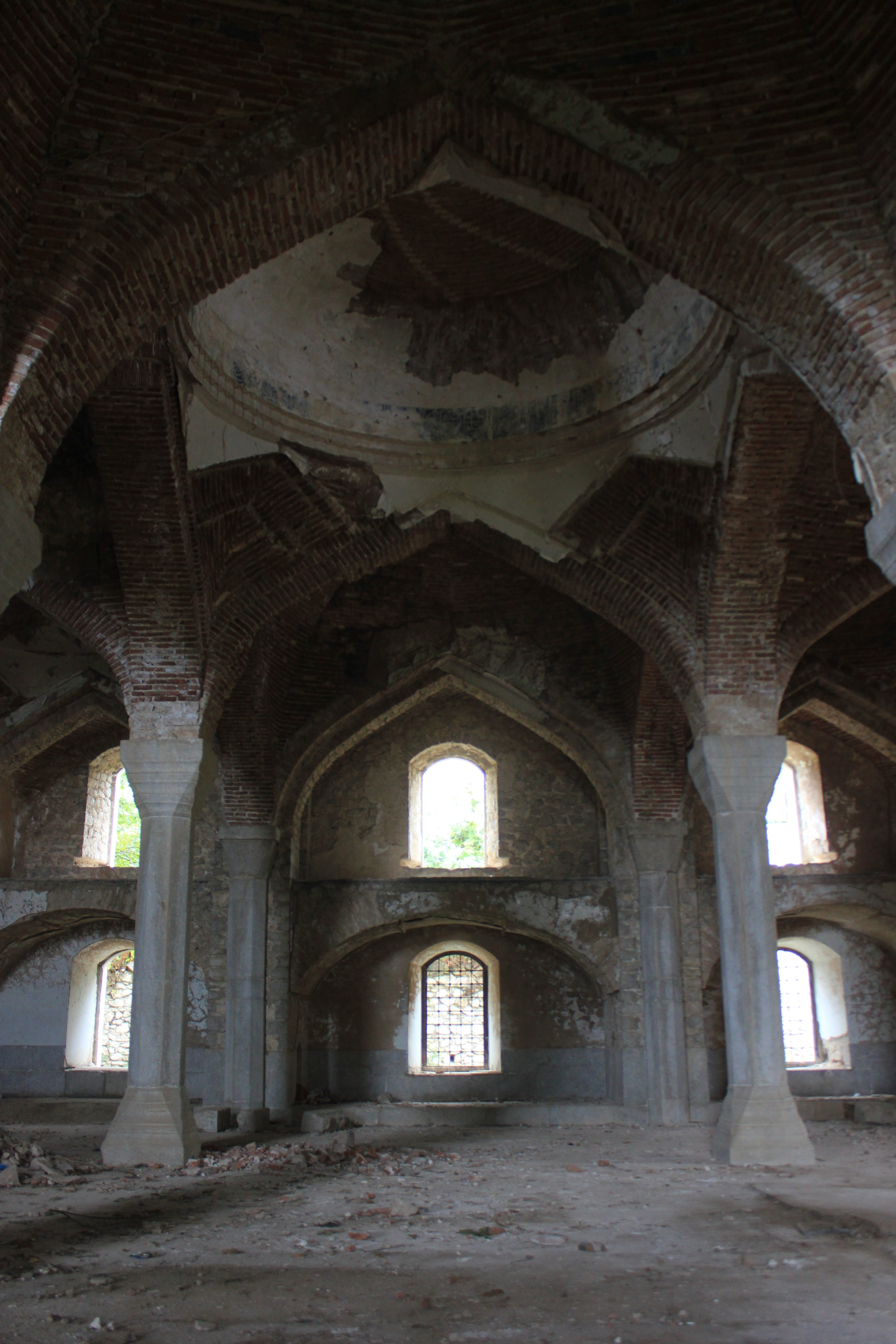
Inside the mosque

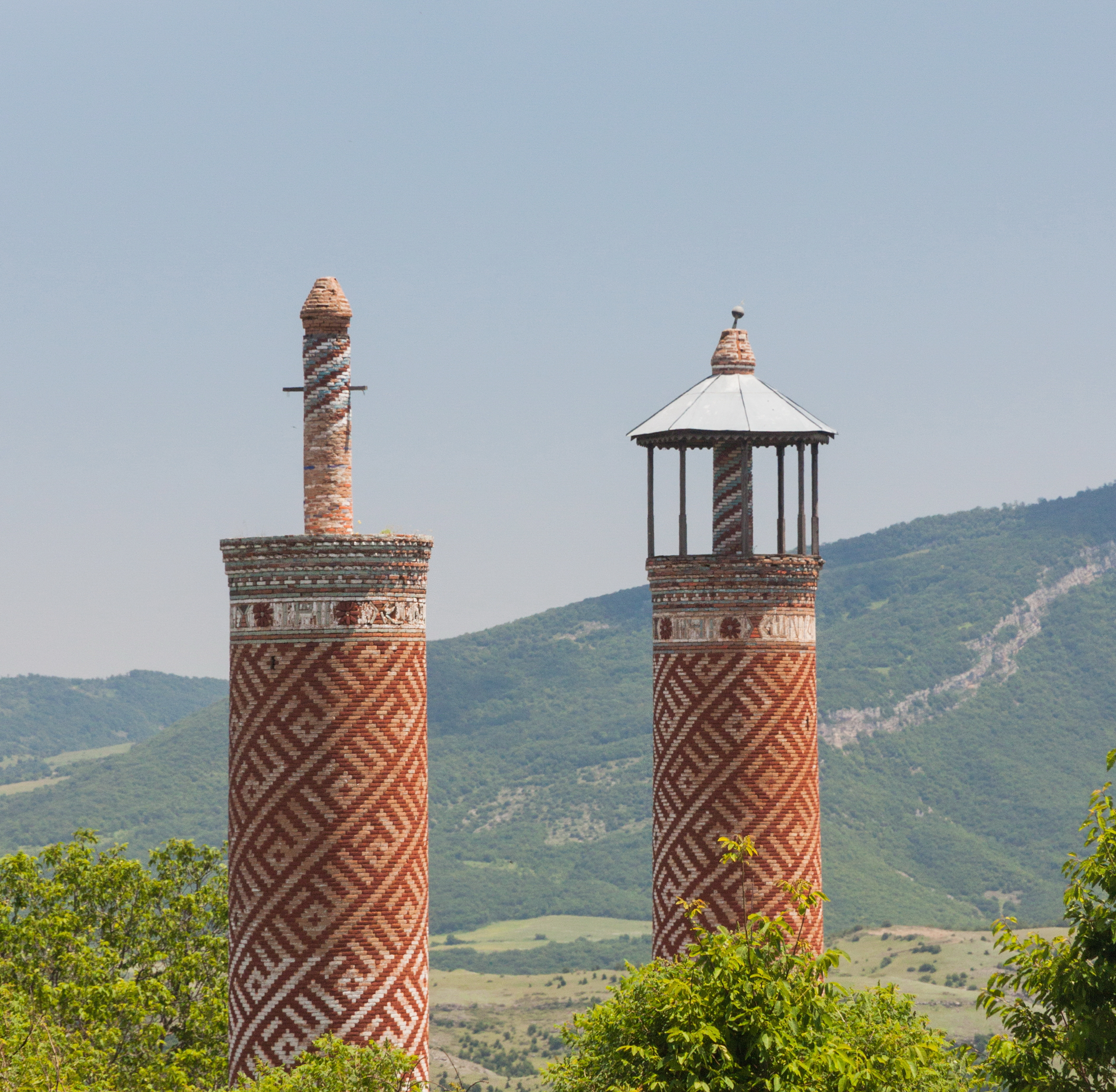
Minarets

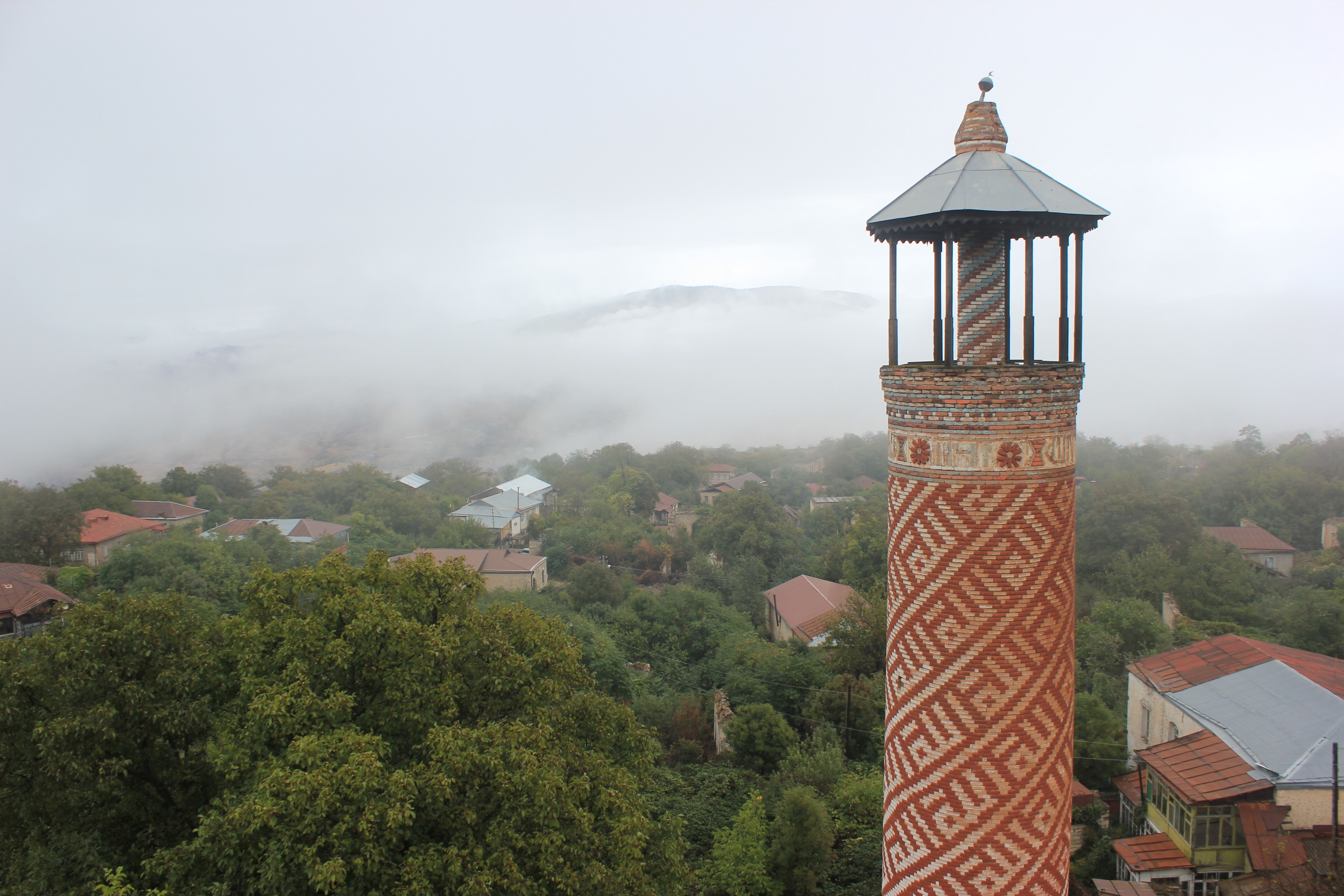
View from a minaret

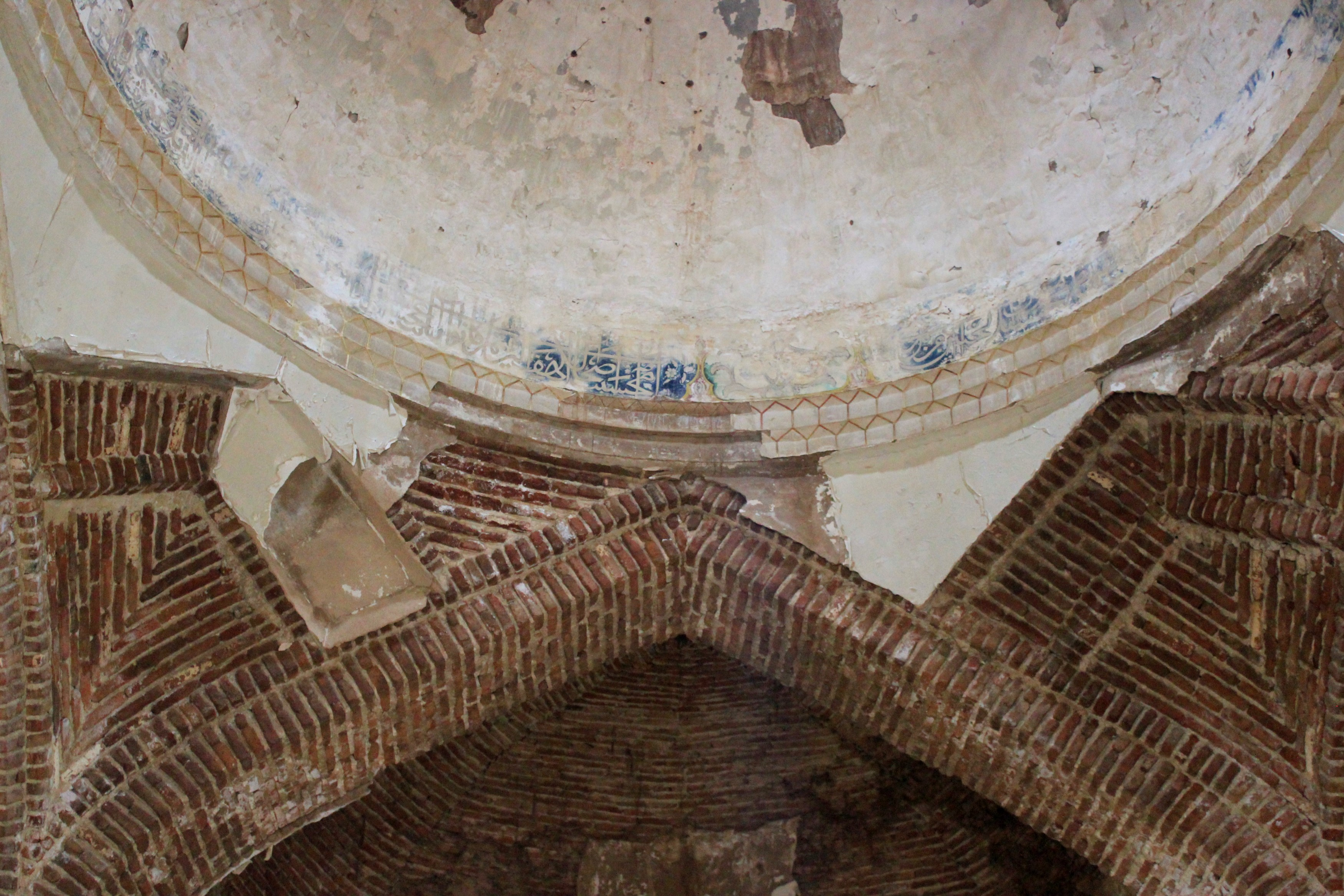
Inscription inside

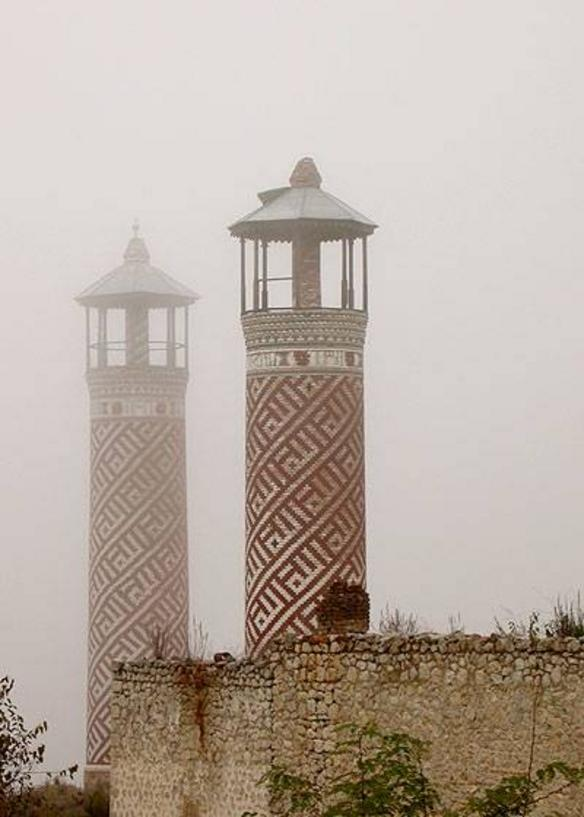
Ruins of the mosque

== See also ==
- Islam in Azerbaijan
- List of mosques in Azerbaijan
- Mosques list of Shusha
