= Yukhari Govhar Agha Mosque =

Mosque in Shusha, Azerbaijan

- Azerbaijani: Yuxarı Gövhər Ağa Məscidi
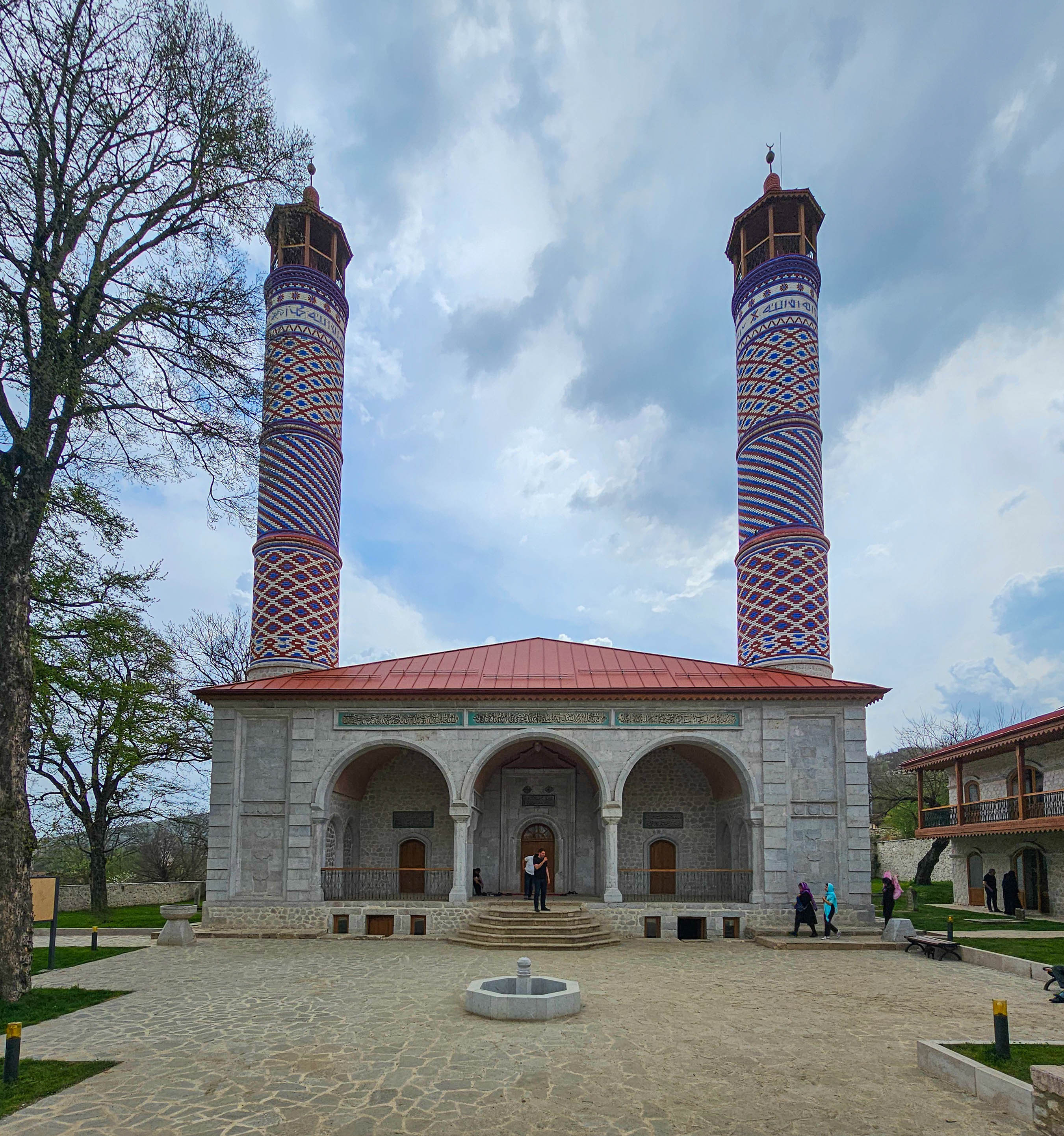
- The restored mosque in 2024

- Location of the mosque in Azerbaijan

Religion
- Affiliation: Shia Islam

Location
- Location: Shusha
- Country: Azerbaijan
- Coordinates: 39°45′36″N 46°45′09″E

Architecture
- Architect: Karbalayi Safikhan Karabakhi
- Type: Mosque architecture
- Style: Islamic
- Founder: Ibrahim Khalil Khan
- Groundbreaking: 1182 AH (1768/1769 CE)
- Completed: 1885
- Minaret: 2

The Yukhari Govhar Agha Mosque (Azerbaijani: Yuxarı Gövhər Ağa Məscidi), also called the Great Mosque of Govhar Agha (Azerbaijani: Boyuk Juma Gövhər Ağanın Cümə Məscidi), is a Shia Islam mosque located in the city of Shusha, Azerbaijan.

== History ==
The Yukhari Govhar Agha means "The Upper Govhar Agha Mosque" in Azerbaijani, referring to the location of the mosque in the upper section of Shusha town and to distinguish it from the Ashaghi Govhar Agha Mosque, the same-name mosque located in the lower section of the town. Both mosques are considered symbols of Shusha and masterpieces of Eastern architecture. The Yukhari Govhar Agha Mosque is located on Shusha's main square, Yusif Vazir Chamanzaminli street and makes up a big part of the architectural complex including madrasa, shops, and houses built by the same architect. According to historian and author of "Karabakh-name", Mirza Jamal Karabakhi, construction of the mosque was started with orders of Ibrahim Khalil Khan in 1182 AH (1768/1769 CE), but was stopped for a long time. The construction was then restarted and completed in 1883–1885 by architect Karbalayi Safikhan Karabakhi ordered by Govhar Agha, daughter of Ibrahim Khalil Khan.

== The exterior and interior ==
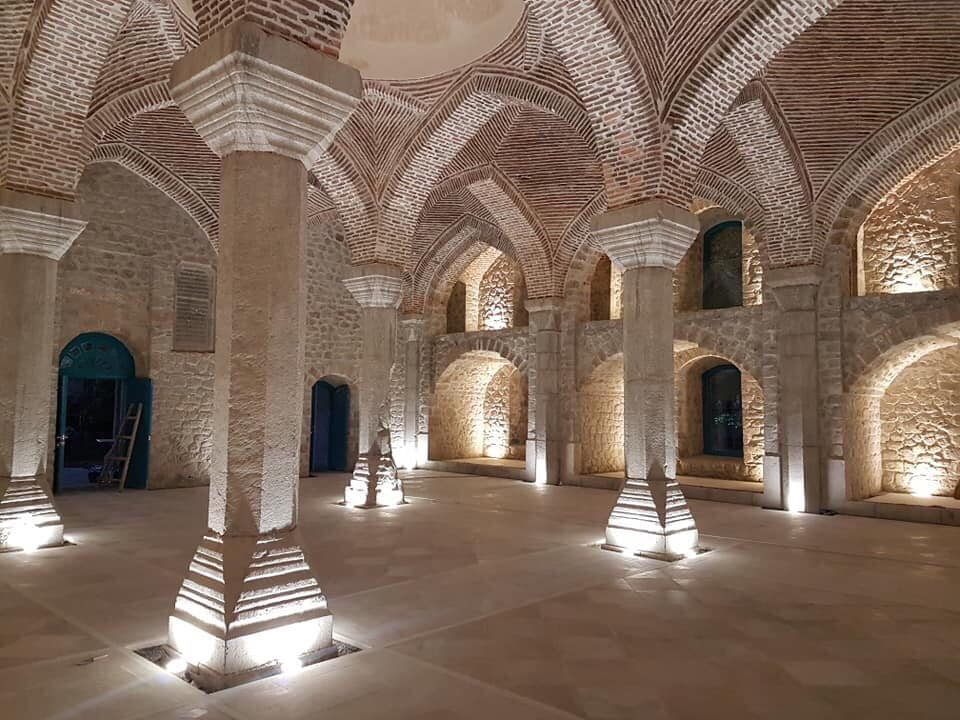
The mosque's renovated interior

The prayer hall of Yukhari Govhar Agha Mosque is a three-nave in a square shape, 190 m × 185 m (623 ft × 607 ft), split by six stone columns. The three-beam veranda in the northern section of the mosque gives it a rectangular form, 26.5 m × 21.5 m (87 ft × 71 ft). The mosque has two minarets. The balconies used to host women's premises of the prayer hall. The interior of the prayer hall gets light from dual windows. The two minarets on the facade make up the veranda. The building of the mosque was constructed out of stone, while the two minarets are made of bricks. The minarets have cylindric forms with horizontal belts, with each section laid in distinguishing brick patterns. The same construction pattern can be viewed in most of the mosques throughout Karabakh built by Kerbalayi Safikhan Karabakhi.

== Current situation ==
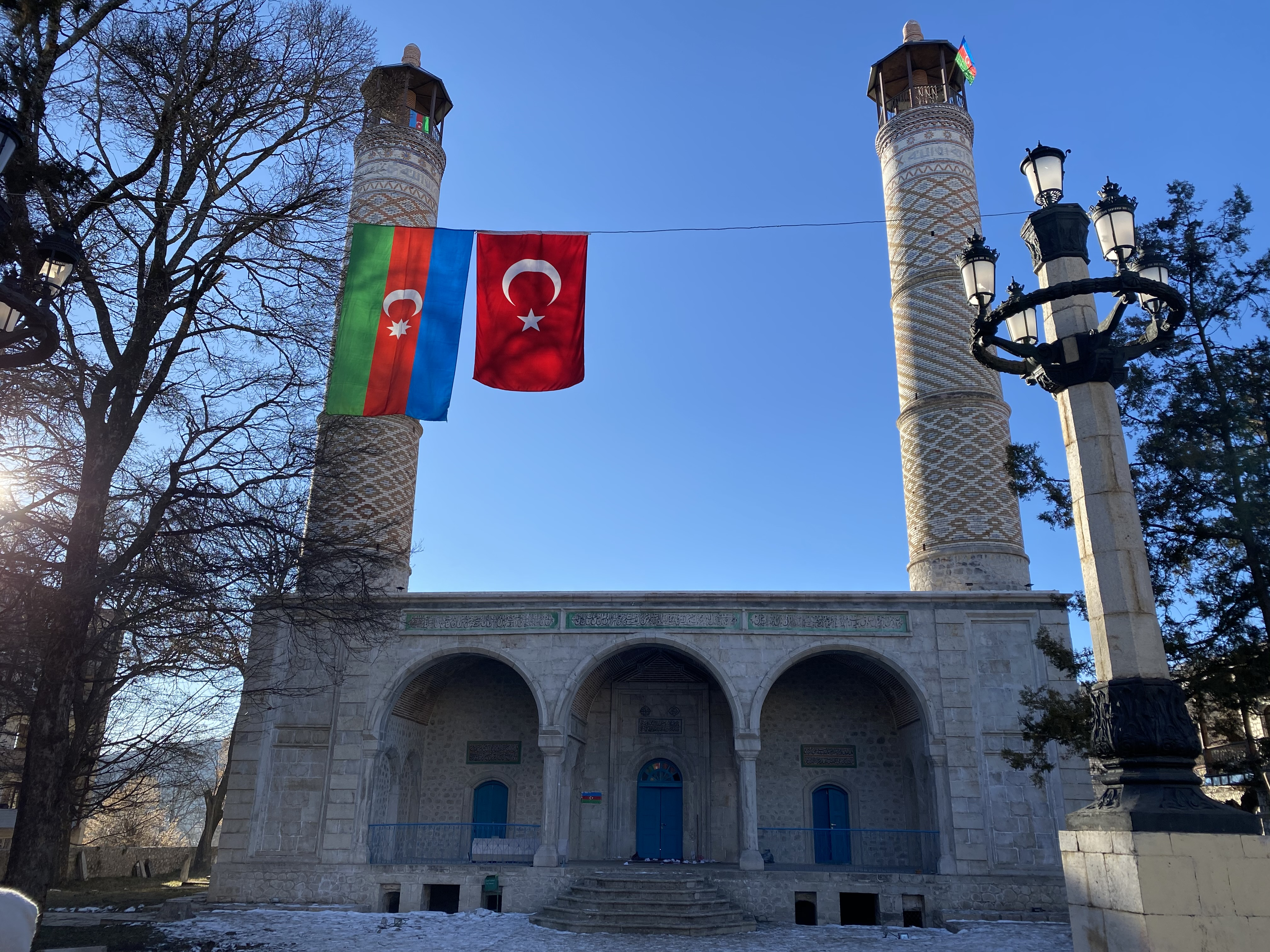
The mosque on 21 January 2021

In Soviet times, the mosque was closed and used as a museum but reopened as a functioning mosque in 1988. After the capture of Shusha by Karabakhi-Armenian forces in 1992, the mosque stopped functioning. Following a minor restoration of the mosque in 2008–2009, fixing the roof, officials from Nagorno-Karabakh Ministry of Economy ordered a restoration project, hiring Iranian experts to carry out the restoration works. Azerbaijani officials expressed their unhappiness with the restoration project, with the Deputy Chairman of the State Committee for Work with Religious Organizations Gunduz Ismayilov claiming that "Armenia's intention to restore the historical Azerbaijani mosque in Shusha is an attempt to cover up the vandalism it did to Azerbaijani cultural-religious monuments in the occupied territories".

After several years of restoration work, the Yukhari Govhar Agha Mosque, neighboring madrasa, and park were formally opened for tourism with a ceremony on 14 October 2019. The project was undertaken by the Initiative for Development of Armenia (IDeA) Foundation with the support of private donations, with notable contributions from Russian-Armenian businessman Ruben Vardanyan's Revival of Oriental Historical Heritage Foundation. and Kazakh businessman, Kairat Boranbayev.

The complex was to be used as an Armenian-Iranian Cultural Center. Notably, there was no mention of the former Azeri presence and the complex was presented as an Iranian mosque.

The first Friday prayer was held in the mosque, after 28 years, on 13 November 2020 by Azerbaijan soldiers. Restoration of the mosque commenced in late 2021, funded with the support of the Heydar Aliyev Foundation.

== Gallery ==
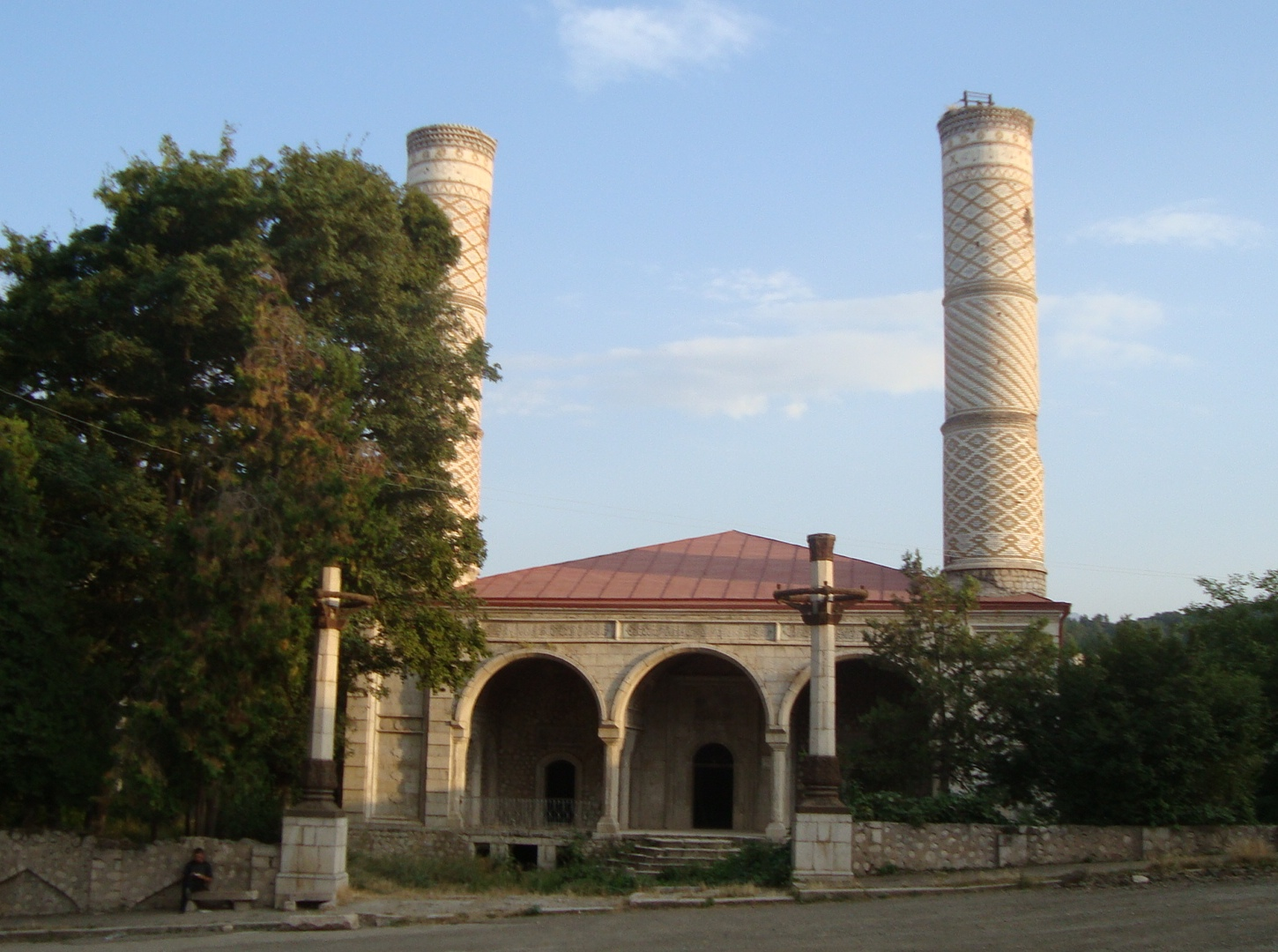
The mosque in 2010

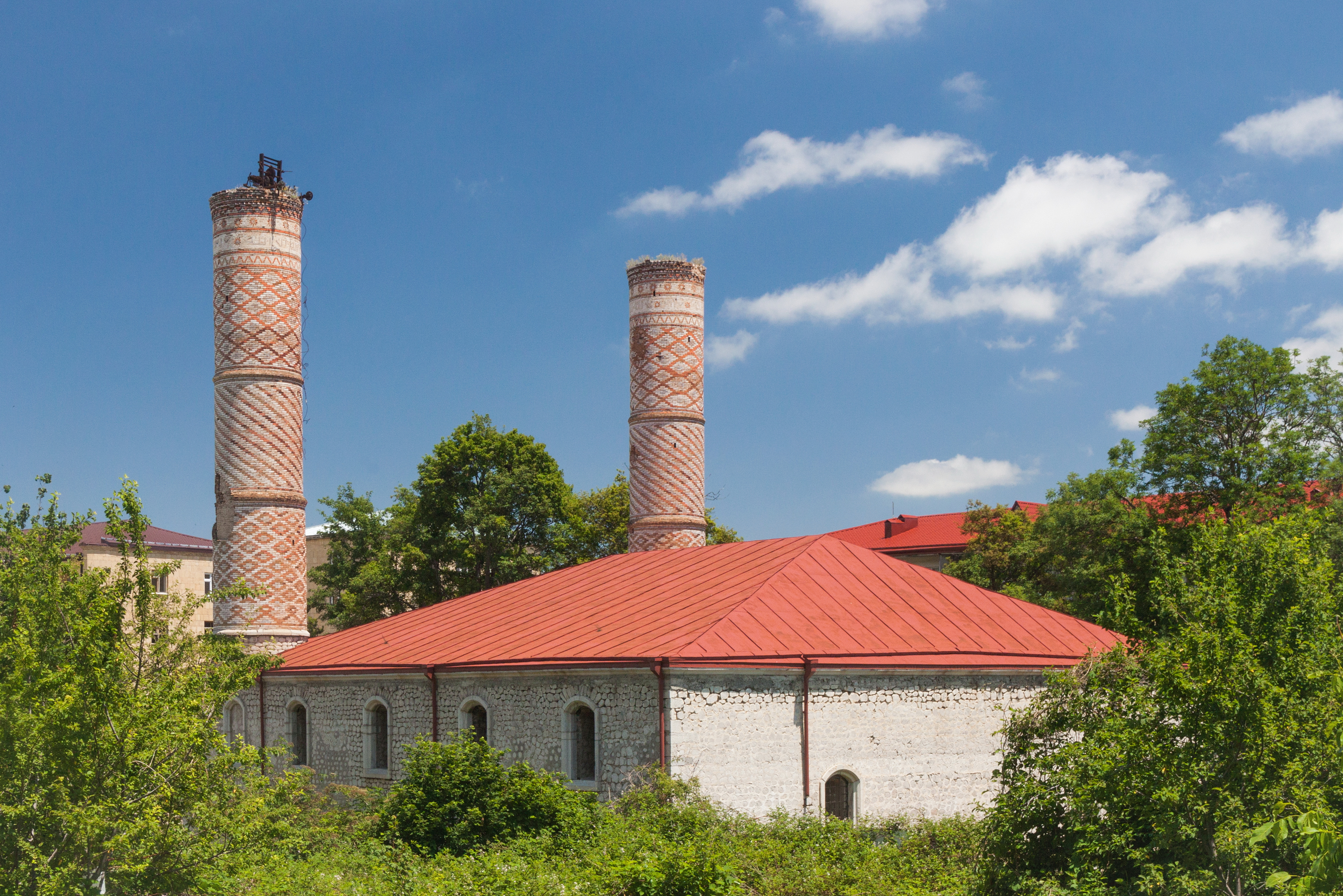
View from south-west in 2014

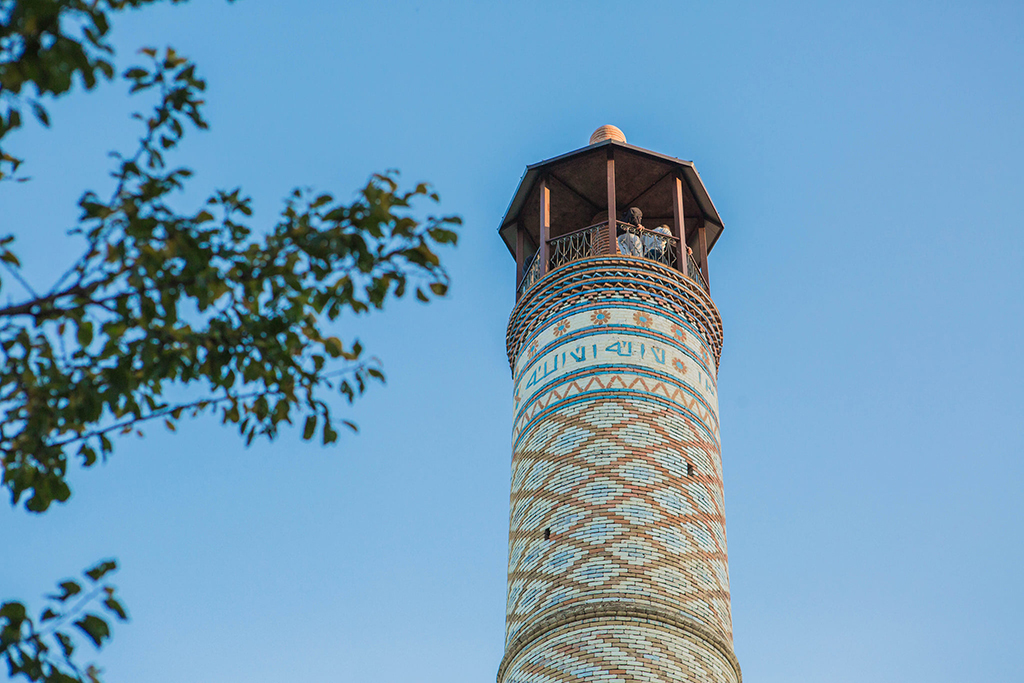
One of the restored minarets

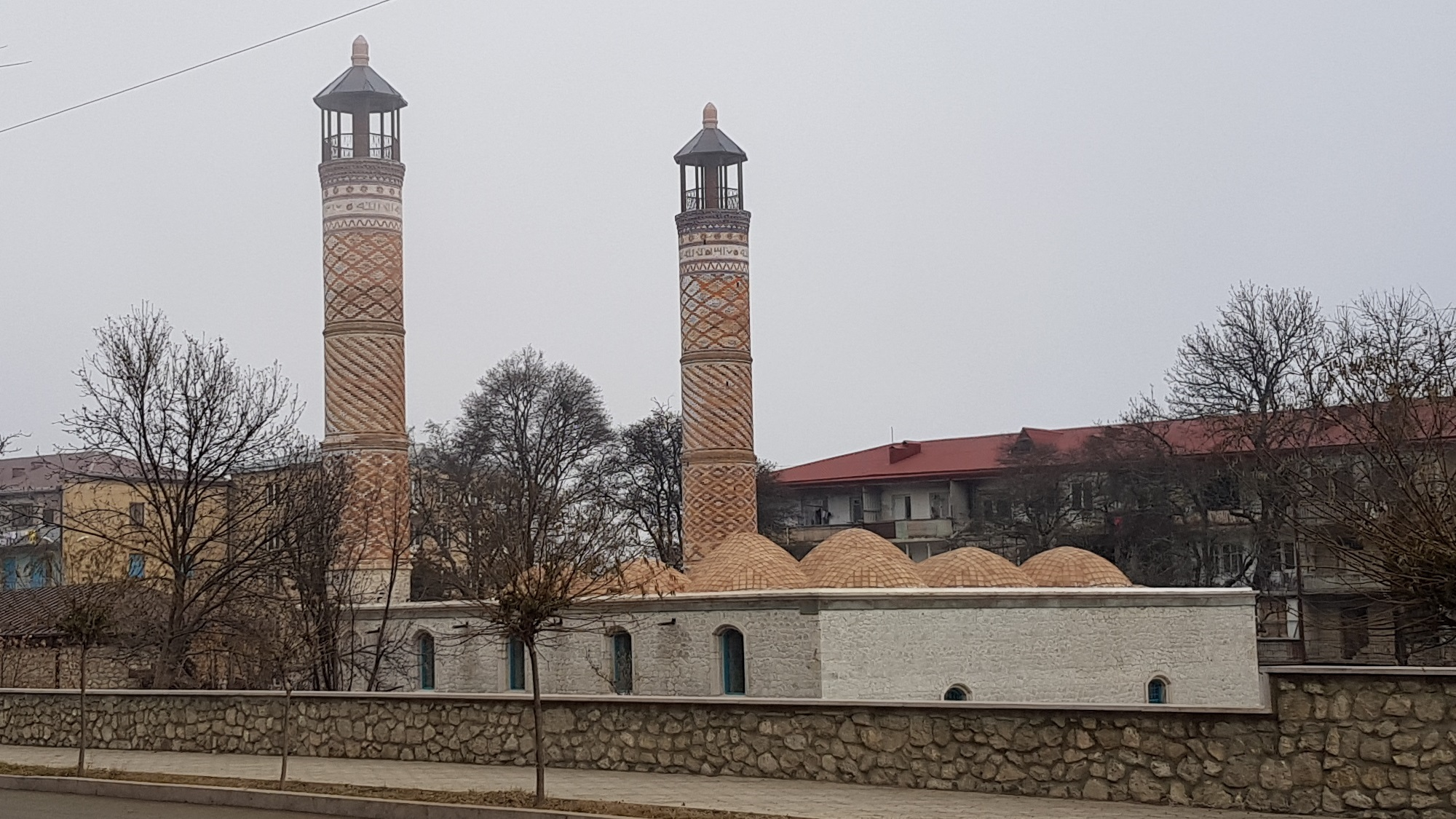
Upper Mosque of Shusha. View from the south-west in 2019 after restoration

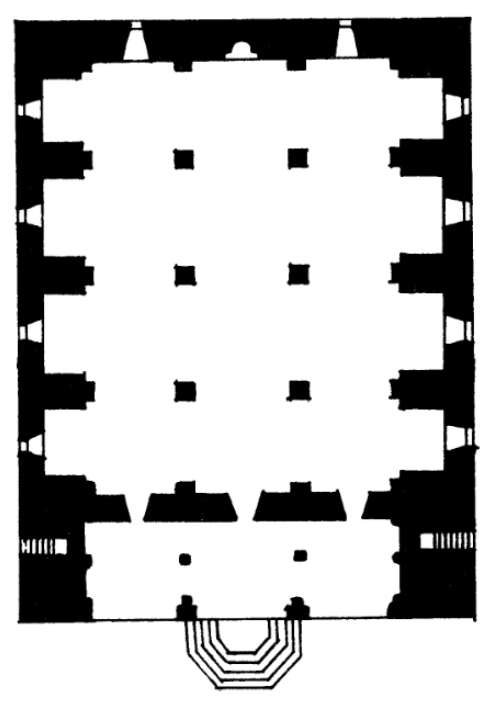
The architectural plan of the mosque

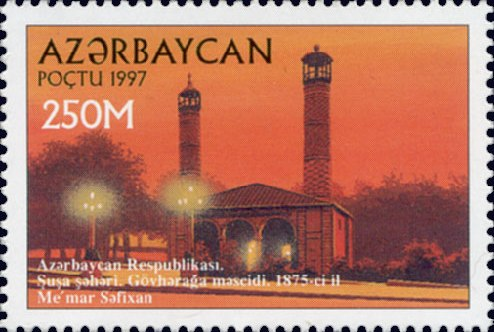
Mosque on the stamp of Azerbaijan

== See also ==
- Shia Islam in Azerbaijan
- List of mosques in Azerbaijan
