= List of Armenians from Nagorno-Karabakh =

Artsakh Armenians
Regions with significant populations
- Armenia 144,683

Languages
- Armenian (Artsakh dialect)

Religion
- Predominantly Armenian Apostolic Church

Related ethnic groups
- Armenians

This is a list of Armenians from Nagorno Karabakh.

== Arts ==
- André, pop singer, first artist to represent Armenia in the Eurovision Song Contest in 2006
- Don Askarian, filmmaker, recipient of the Golden Camera Award for Life Achievement at Int. ART Film Festival, Slovakia
- Zori Balayan, novelist, journalist, public activist
- Vladimir Arzumanyan, child singer, winner of Junior Eurovision Song Contest 2010

== Scientists and scholars ==
- Armen Abaghian, atomic energy specialist, Doctor of Technical Sciences, member of Russian Academy of Sciences
- Artashes Arakelian (1909–1993), economist, the head of the Economy Institute of Armenian Science Academy
- Arakel Babakhanian (1860–1932), historian, publicist, writer, critic
- Ivan Knuniants (1906–1990), Soviet chemist
- Khoren Sargsian (1891–1970), writer, critic, the director of the Literature Institute of Armenian Academy of Sciences (1943–1947)
- Armen Takhtajian (1910–2009), botanist
- Ashot Hovhannisian (1887–1972), Marxist historian and Communist official
- Andronik Iosifyan (1905–1993), Soviet engineer

== Writers and artists ==
- Stepan Aghajanian (1863–1940), artist, distinguished as a portrait artist
- Mikael Arutchian (1897–1961), theatrical painter and designer
- Hakob Gyurjian (1881–1948), sculptor
- Gevork Kotiantz (1906–1996), painter
- Alexander Melik-Pashaev (1905–1964), conductor, born in Tiflis in a family from Shushi
- Muratsan (1854–1908), writer, one of the most famous figures in Armenian literature
- Arsen Terteryan (1882–1953), literary critic
- Vagharsh Vagharshian (1894–1959), director, playwright, actor, theater and public figure

== Politics and statesmen ==
- Hambardzum Arakelian (Shakhriar) (1855–1918), public and political figure
- Yeghishe Astsatryan (1911–2008), Soviet statesman
- Alexander Atabekian (1868–1933), political figure, anarchist
- Artashes Babalian (1887–1959), doctor, politician
- Alexander Bekzadyan (1879–1938), Soviet statesman, Soviet ambassador in Norway and Hungary
- Yeghishe Ishkhanian (1886–1975), political figure
- Aram Manukian (1879–1919), statesman, the founder of the First Republic of Armenia
- Arkadi Ghukasyan, politician, 2nd president of Nagorno-Karabakh Republic
- Bako Sahakyan, 3rd president of Nagorno-Karabakh Republic
- Arayik Harutyunyan, Prime Minister of the Nagorno-Karabakh Republic (2007-2017), current president of the Nagorno-Karabakh Republic
- Robert Kocharyan, 2nd president of Armenia
- Serzh Sargsyan, 3rd president of Armenia
- Sahak Ter-Gabrielyan (1886–1937), Soviet statesman and politician
- Tuman Tumian (1879–1906), political activist
- Karen Karapetyan, Prime Minister of Armenia (2016-2018)

== Military figures ==
- Samvel Babayan (b. 1965), military commander
- Nikol Duman (1867–1914), fedayee
- Sergei Khudyakov (1906–1950), Soviet Marshal of the Air Force during World War II
- Ivan Lazarev (1820–1879), prince, officer of the Russian army, lieutenant general
- Valerian Madatov (1782–1829), Russian prince and lieutenant-general
- Nelson Stepanyan (1913–1944), pilot, lieutenant colonel, Hero of the Soviet Union

== Religious figures ==
- Karekin I (Cilicia), Catholicos of Cilicia from 1943 to 1952.
- Pargev Martirosyan, Primate of the Diocese of Artsakh since 1989

== See also ==
- List of Armenians
- List of Azerbaijanis from Nagorno-Karabakh
