= Terteryan =

Terteryan or Terterian (Armenian: Տերտերյան) is an Armenian surname that may refer to the following notable people:

- Arsen Terteryan (1882–1953), Armenian literary critic
- Avet Terterian (1929–1994), Armenian music composer
- Davit Terteryan (born 1997), Armenian football player
- Gaspar Terteryan (born 2005), Armenian Greco-Roman wrestler
- Hambardzum Terteryan (1884–?), leader of the Armenian Revolutionary Federation
- Nikolai Terteryan (born 2001), Danish boxer
