= Mashhadi Mahammad Bulbul =

- Born: 1858; Shusha, Shusha uezd, Elizavetpol Governorate, Russian Empire
- Died: 1918 (aged 59–60); Shusha, Shusha uezd, Elizavetpol Governorate, Russian Empire
- Occupation: Poet
- Writing career
- Language: Azerbaijani

Mashhadi Mahammad Bulbul (b. Shusha, Shusha uezd, Elizavetpol Governorate, Russian Empire; 1858 - d. Shusha, Shusha uezd, Elizavetpol Governorate, Russian Empire; 1918) was an Azerbaijani poet and khananda of the 19th century, member of the literary society "Majlisi-Faramushan".

== Life and creativity ==
Mashhadi Mahammad Bulbul was born in Shusha in 1858. He also received education at Molla Ibrahim's school in Shusha, where he studied Arabic and Persian languages, read the Quran expressively, and learned calligraphy. During his schooling, he deeply mastered Eastern literature. He showed a great interest in folk literature and love poems; folk songs inspired him and further refined his artistic taste. Due to his beautiful voice and temperament, he participated in some gatherings and sang his ghazals. However, for certain reasons, Mashhadi Mahammad left the art of singing and became an active participant in literary societies, devoting himself more to literary creativity. During this time, Bulbul engaged in trade to support his family during the years of drought and famine that frequently occurred in Karabakh. He traveled to major industrial cities to earn a living. After many years, the poet returned to Shusha, where he died in 1918.

A small portion of Bulbul's literary heritage has survived to this day. It consists of poems written in Azerbaijani and Persian. Although he mainly wrote ghazals, he also wrote qasidas and rubais. The poet adheres to classical Eastern traditions, especially composing in the tradition of Fuzuli, which was typical for poets of the 19th century, as he was influenced by Fuzuli.

== See also ==
- Mirza Ismail Javanshir
