= List of Azerbaijanis from Nagorno-Karabakh =

This is a list of Azerbaijanis from Nagorno-Karabakh.

== Prominent people from Shusha ==
- Mir Mohsun Navvab, artist and poet
- Khurshidbanu Natavan, poet
- Sadigjan, musician, inventor of the Azeri variety of tar
- Gasim bey Zakir, poet
- Khudadat bey Malik-Aslanov, scientist and politician
- Najaf bey Vazirov, playwright and journalist
- Bulbul, folk and opera singer
- Bulbuljan, folk singer
- Abulfat Aliyev, mugham singer
- Abdurrahim Hagverdiyev, dramatist
- Yusif Vazir Chamanzaminli (12 September 1887 to 3 January 1943 in the GULAG, near Gorky, Russia), core author of the novel Ali and Nino, published under the pseudonym Kurban Said
- Karim bey Mehmandarov, doctor and social activist
- Khan Shushinski, folk singer
- Shamsi Badalbeyli, theatre director and actor
- Suleyman Sani Akhundov, Azerbaijani playwright, journalist, children's author, and teacher (3 October 1875, Shusha – 29 March 1939, Baku)
- Ahmad Agdamski, Azerbaijani opera singer, mugam singer and actor (5 January 1884, Shusha – 1 April 1954 Agdash)
- Soltan Hajibeyov, Azerbaijani composer and People's Artist of the USSR (5 May 1919 Shusha – 19 September 1974 Baku)
- Uzeyir Hajibeyov (1885–1948), founder of Azerbaijani composed music
- Jabbar Garyagdioglu, Azerbaijani folk singer (khananda) (31 March 1861 Shusha – 20 April 1944 Baku)
- Seyid Shushinski, Azerbaijani folk singer (khananda) (12 April 1889, Horadiz – 1 November 1965, Baku)
- Mir Hasan Vazirov, Azerbaijani revolutioner and one of the 26 Baku Commissars
- Latif Karimov, Azerbaijani carpet designer known for his contributions to a variety of artistic fields.(17 November 1906, Shusha – 1991, Baku)
- Mehdigulu Khan Vefa, lyrical poet of Azerbaijan, lieutenant colonel in the Russian Army, son of a famous Karabakh poet Khurshidbanu Natavan (1855 Shusha – 1900 1900 Tiflis)
- Majid Behbudov, 18 April 1873 — 6 September 1945) was an Azerbaijani khananda.

== Prominent people from Stepanakert ==
- Fakhraddin Manafov, actor

== Prominent people from Hadrut ==
- Javad Malik-Yeganov, politician

== See also ==
- List of Azerbaijanis
- List of Armenians from Nagorno-Karabakh
