= Abdulla Beg Velizade =

- Born: 1841; Shusha, Russian Empire (in present-day Azerbaijan)
- Died: 1912 (aged 70–71); Shusha, Russian Empire
- Occupation: Poet
- Children: Husseinqulu Beg, Khanlar Beg, Hasanqulu Beg, Abbasqulu Beg, Jabbar Beg, and Vali Velizade, Sanubar khanim

Abdulla Beg Velizade (known as Mashadi Abish Beg; 1841, Shusha, Caspian province – 1912, Shusha) was a poet and a member of the Baharly tribe. He was the son of Mashadi Asadulla beg Veliev.

== Life ==
Abdulla Beg Velizade was born in 1841 in the city of Shusha. He knew Persian and Russian languages. His father, Mashadi Asadulla Beg Veliev, son of Haji Hasanali Beg Veliev, was known as a merchant in Shusha. His mother's name was Azad khanum. He was the younger brother of Mahammadali Beg Velizade.

Abdulla Beg received his education in Shusha and was an active member of the "Majlisi-Faramushan" organized by Mir Mohsun Navvab, writing poems in a classical style.

While a member of "Majlisi-Faramushan," Abdulla Beg Velizade befriended and exchanged poems with several poets. He exchanged poems with poets such as Hasanali khan Garadaghi and Fatma khanum Kamina, who were also members of "Majlisi-Faramushan."

Mirza Khosrov Akhundov, a contemporary of Abdulla Beg Velizade living in Shusha, mentioned Abdulla Beg with respect in several places in his work "Pages from Life" (Baku, 1992) and in the poem "The River of Shusha," written in 1944 in memory of Mir Mohsun Navvab. The book "Poetic Gatherings" (Baku, 1987) includes two ghazals by Abdulla Beg and provides brief information about him.

== Death ==
Abdulla Beg Velizade died around 1912 in the city of Shusha.

== Family ==
Abdulla Beg had six sons: Husseinqulu Beg, Khanlar Beg, Hasanqulu Beg, Abbasqulu Beg, Jabbar Beg, and Vali Velizade, as well as one daughter named Sanubar.

== Bibliography ==
- Çingizoğlu, Ənvər (2008). Baharlı oymağı (in Azerbaijani). Bakı: "Soy" dərgisi. pp. 22–79.
- Zakiroğlu, Orxan (2014). Mirzə Vəli bəy və onun nəslinin tanınmış övladları (in Azerbaijani). Bakı: Azərbaycan Tarixi Şəcərə Cəmiyyətinin Xəbərləri.
- Zakiroğlu, Orxan. Baharlı tayfasının şair oğlu (in Azerbaijani). Bütöv Azərbaycan qəzeti.
