= Shusha =

City in Azerbaijan

Shusha / Shushi Şuşa / Շուշի
- City
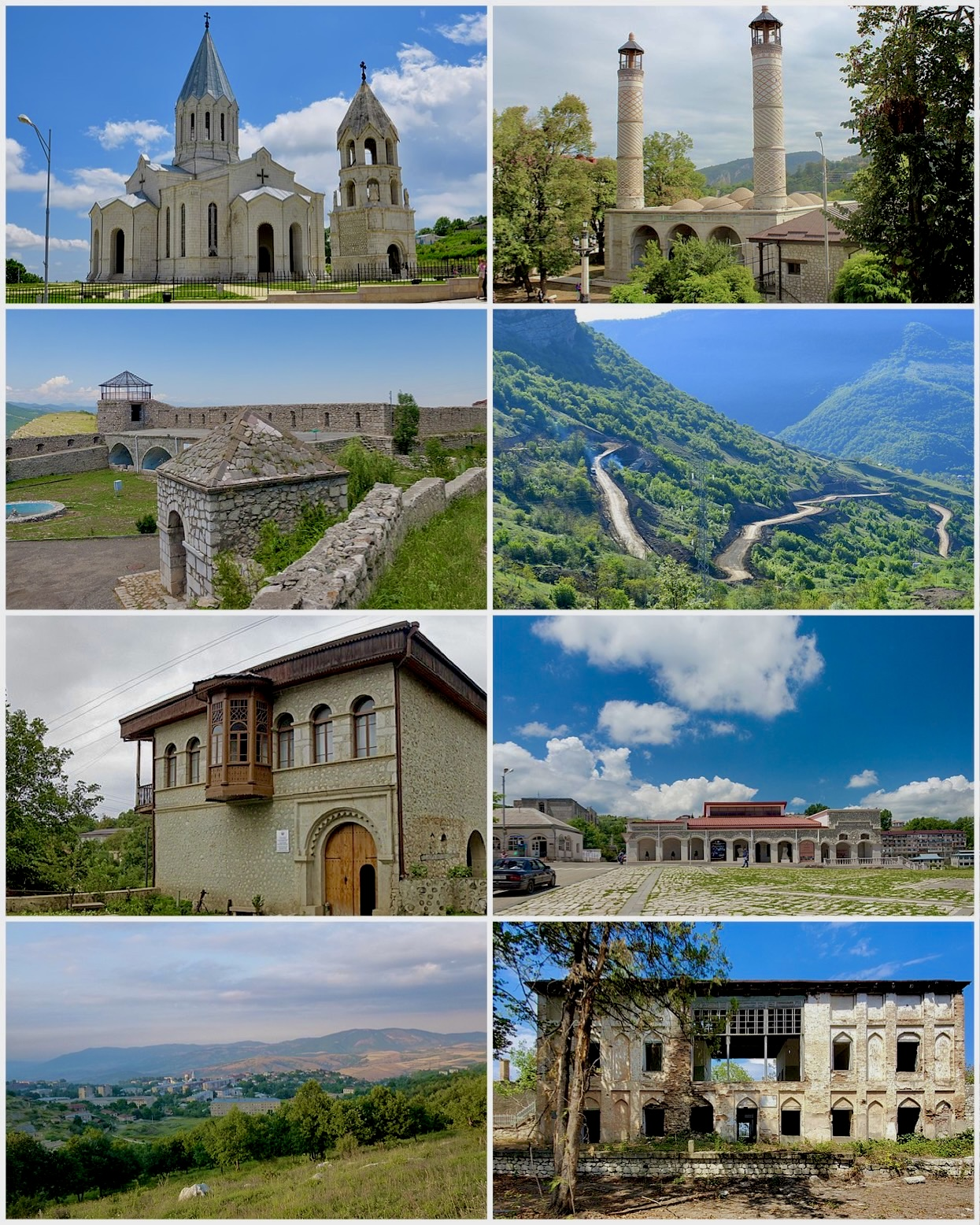
- Landmarks of Shusha, from top left: Ghazanchetsots Cathedral • Yukhari Govhar Agha Mosque; Shusha fortress • Shusha mountains House of Mehmandarovs • City center Shusha skyline • House of Khurshidbanu Natavan

- Location within Azerbaijan Location within Karabakh Economic Region
- Coordinates: 39°45′30″N 46°44′54″E
- Country: Azerbaijan
- Region: Karabakh
- District: Shusha

Government
  - Mayor: Bayram Safarov
  - Special representative: Aydin Karimov

Area
  - Total: 5.5 km^{2} (2.1 sq mi)
- Highest elevation: 1,800 m (5,900 ft)
- Lowest elevation: 1,400 m (4,600 ft)

Population (2015)
  - Total: 4,064
- Demonym(s): Şuşalı ("Shushaly"; in Azerbaijani ) Շուշեցի ("Shushets'i"; in Armenian)
- Time zone: UTC+4 (AZT)
- ISO 3166 code: AZ-SUS
- Vehicle registration: 58 AZ
- Website: shusha-ih.gov.az

Shusha (Azerbaijani: Şuşa,) or Shushi (Armenian: Շուշի) is a city in Nagorno-Karabakh, Azerbaijan. Situated at an altitude of 1.4–1.8 kilometres (4,600–5,900 ft) in the Karabakh mountains, the city was a mountain resort in the Soviet era.

The origin of the city is disputed, in the 1750s, Panah Ali Khan founded the Karabakh Khanate, and the city developed with the establishment of the fortress of Shusha. There was an alliance between Panah Ali Khan and Melik Shahnazar, the local Armenian prince (melik) of Varanda. The nearby Armenian village of Shosh (see § Etymology for further information), has been suggested as an origin of the town's name. The town has been described as an important center within the Armenian melikdoms of Karabakh in the 1720s, and the plateau has been suggested to have been the site of an already existing Armenian fortification. From the mid-18th century to 1822, Shusha was the capital of the Karabakh Khanate. The town became one of the cultural centers of the South Caucasus after the Russian conquest of the Caucasus region from Qajar Iran in the first half of the 19th century. Over the course of the 19th century, the town grew in size to become a city, and was home to many Armenian and Azerbaijani intellectuals, poets, writers and musicians (including Azerbaijani ashiks, mugham singers and kobuz players.

The town has religious, cultural and strategic importance to both groups. Shusha is often considered the cradle of Azerbaijan's music and poetry, and one of the leading centres of the Azerbaijani culture. Shusha also contains a number of Armenian Apostolic churches, including Ghazanchetsots Cathedral and Kanach Zham (demolished by Azerbaijan as of 2026), and serves as a land link between Nagorno-Karabakh and Armenia, via the Lachin corridor to the west. Throughout modern history, the city fostered a mixed Armenian–Azerbaijani population. The first available demographic information about the city in 1823 suggests the city had an Azerbaijani majority. The Armenian inhabitants of the city steadily grew over time to constitute a majority of the city's population until the Shusha massacre in 1920, in which the Armenian half of the city was destroyed by Azerbaijani forces, resulting in the death or expulsion of the Armenian population, up to 20,000 people.

The city has suffered significant destruction and depopulation during the Nagorno-Karabakh conflict. After the capture of Shusha in 1992 by Armenian forces during First Nagorno-Karabakh War, the city's Azerbaijani population fled, and most of the city was destroyed. Between May 1992 and November 2020, Shusha was under the de facto control of the breakaway Republic of Artsakh and administered as the centre of its Shushi Province. On 8 November 2020, Azerbaijani forces gained control of the city during the Second Nagorno-Karabakh War following a three-day long battle. The Armenian population of the city fled, and multiple reports emerged that the Armenian cultural heritage of the city was being destroyed.

== Etymology ==
Several historians believe Shusha derives from the New Persian Shīsha ("glass, vessel, bottle, flask"). According to the Oxford Concise Dictionary of World Place-Names, when Iranian ruler Agha Mohammad Khan Qajar approached the town with his army, he reportedly told the ruler of Karabakh Ibrahim Khalil Khan:

God is pouring stones on thy head. Sit ye not then in thy fortress of glass.

Panahabad ("City of Panah"), Shusha's previous name, was a tribute to Panah Ali Khan, the first ruler of the Karabakh Khanate.

According to the Brockhaus and Efron Encyclopedic Dictionary, published in the final decades of the Russian Empire, the town's name comes from the nearby village Shushikent (called Shosh in Armenian), which literally means "Shusha village" in the Azerbaijani language. Conversely, the Armenian historian Leo (1860–1932) considered it more likely that the village Shosh received its name from the fortress, which he considered the older settlement.

According to Armenian sources, the name Shusha most likely derives from the dialectal Armenian word shosh/shush (Armenian: շոշ/շուշ), meaning tree sprout or, figuratively, a high place, first applied either to the adjacent village Shosh or to Shusha itself. The form Shusha can also be explained as the genitive form of shosh/shush, as -a or -ay is a common declensional ending for placenames in pre-modern and dialectal Armenian.

Besides the common Armenian name Shushi, the town has historically been referred to in Armenian by various names, including Shoshi/Shushva Berd, Shoshi Sghnakh, Shoshvaghala, which all mean "Shosh/Shushi Fortress".

== History ==
=== Foundation ===
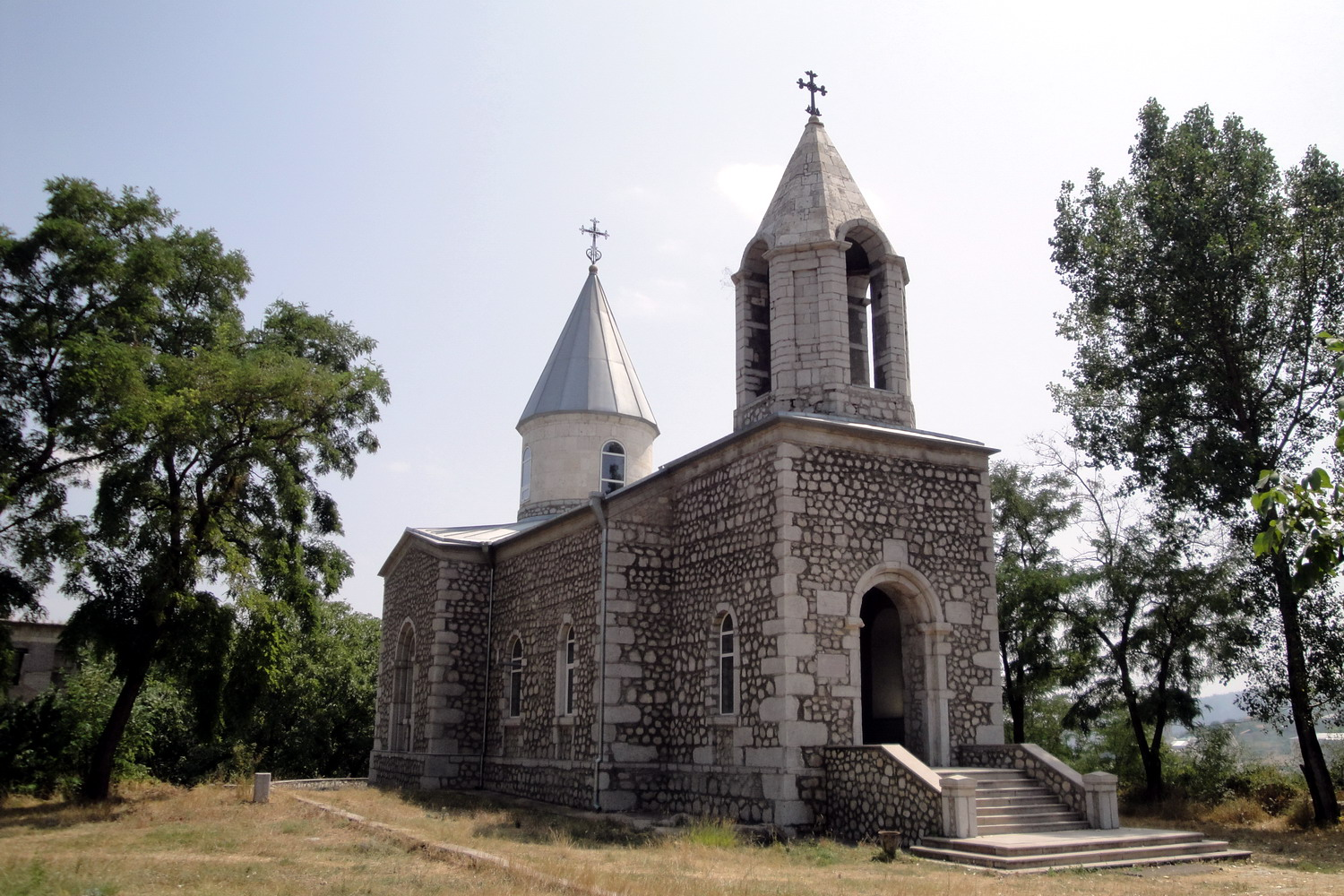
Saint John the Baptist Church (Kanach Zham), built in 1818. The church was demolished by Azerbaijan by 2024.

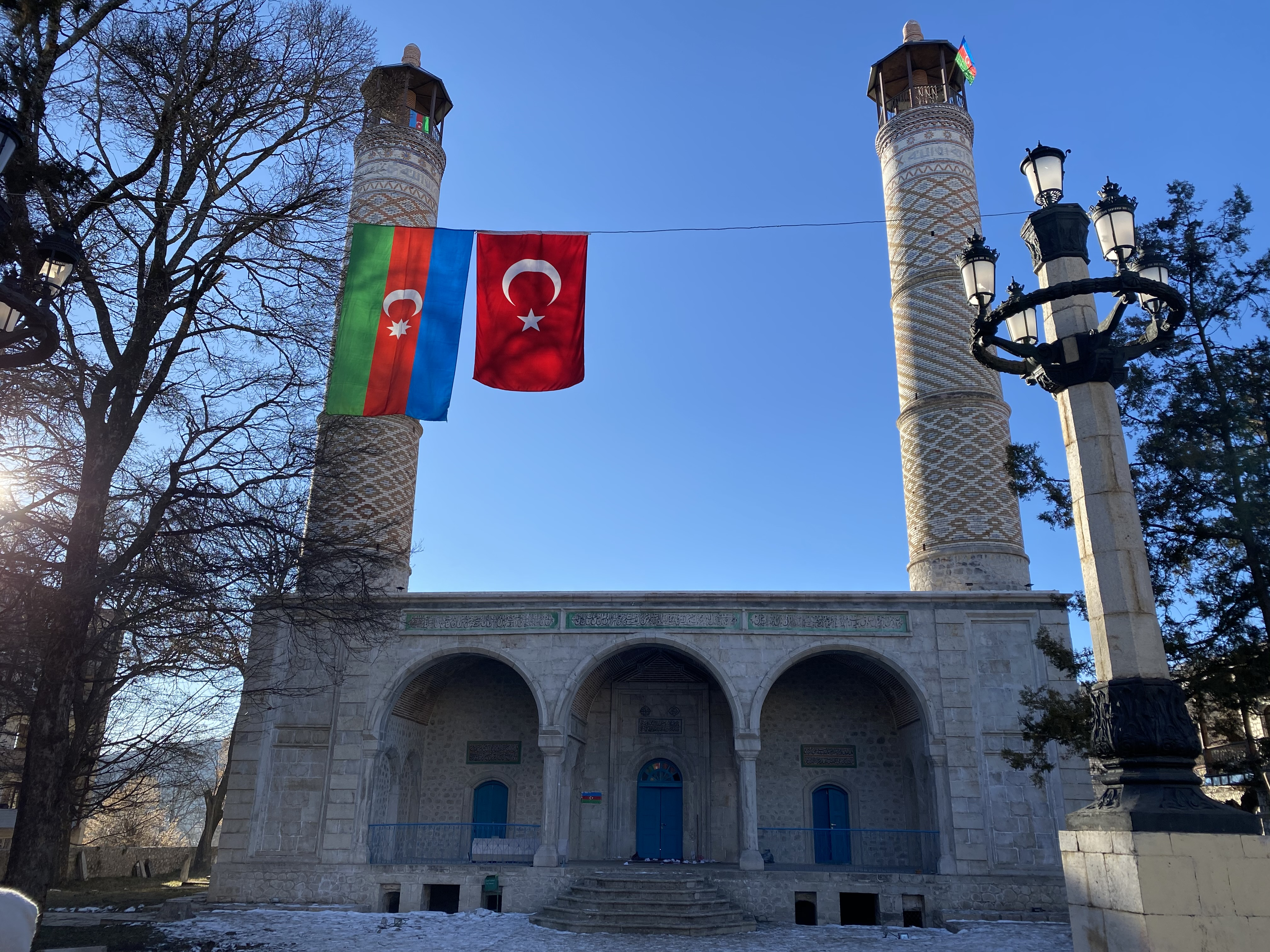
Yukhari Govhar Agha Mosque, completed in 1885.

Some Armenian sources identify Shusha with a fortress called Shikakar or Karaglukh, where the 9th-century Armenian prince Sahl Smbatean is said to have defeated an invading Arab army. According to several sources, a settlement called Shosh served as an ancient fortress in the Armenian principality of Varanda, and had traditionally belonged to the Melik-Shahnazarian princely dynasty. According to some sources, Shushi existed and had a functioning scriptorium in 1428. The fortress was described as a strategic stronghold in one of the Eastern Armenian military districts, called sghnakhs, playing a key role in the Armenian commander Avan Yuzbashi's campaign against Ottoman forces during their incursion into of the South Caucasus in the 1720s and 1730s. Armenian historian and Shusha native Ashot Hovhannisian wrote that the fortress walls must have been built by Avan Yuzbashi in 1724, if not earlier.

Kehva Chelebi, an early Armenian national activist who maintained correspondence between the meliks of Karabakh and the Russian authorities, in a 1725 report describes Shusha as a town and a fort:

… The nearest Armenian stronghold … was Shushi. Shushi is four days' distance from Shemakhi. Armed Armenians under the command of Avan Yuzbashi guard it. After meeting with the Armenian leaders, including the Patriarch, they returned to Derbent via Shemakhi. Rocky mountains surround the town of Shushi. The number of the armed Armenians has not been determined. There are rumors that the Armenians have defeated the Turks in a number of skirmishes in Karabagh …

A 1769 letter by Georgian king Heraclius II to Russian diplomat Count P. Panin states that there was "an ancient fortress in the realm of the Khamsa [melikdoms]" which was "conquered, through deceit" by "one Muslim man from the Jevanshir tribe." The same information about the ancient fortress is confirmed by the Russian field marshal Alexander Suvorov in a letter to Prince Grigory Potemkin. Suvorov writes that the Armenian prince Melik Shahnazar of Varanda surrendered his fortress Shushikala to "certain Panah", whom he called a chief of nomadic Muslims living near the Karabakh borders. When discussing Karabakh and Shusha in the 18th century, the Russian diplomat and historian S. M. Bronevsky writes in his Historical Notes that Shusha fortress was a possession of the Melik-Shahnazarian clan, which was given to Panah Ali Khan in return for aid against the other Armenian meliks of Karabakh. Russian historian P. G. Butkov (1775–1857) writes that "Shushi village" was given to Panah Ali Khan by the Melik-Shahnazarian prince after they entered into an alliance, and that Panah Ali Khan fortified the village. The missionary Joseph Wolff (1795–1862), during his mission in the Middle East, visited "Shushee, in the province of Carabagh, in Armenia Major".

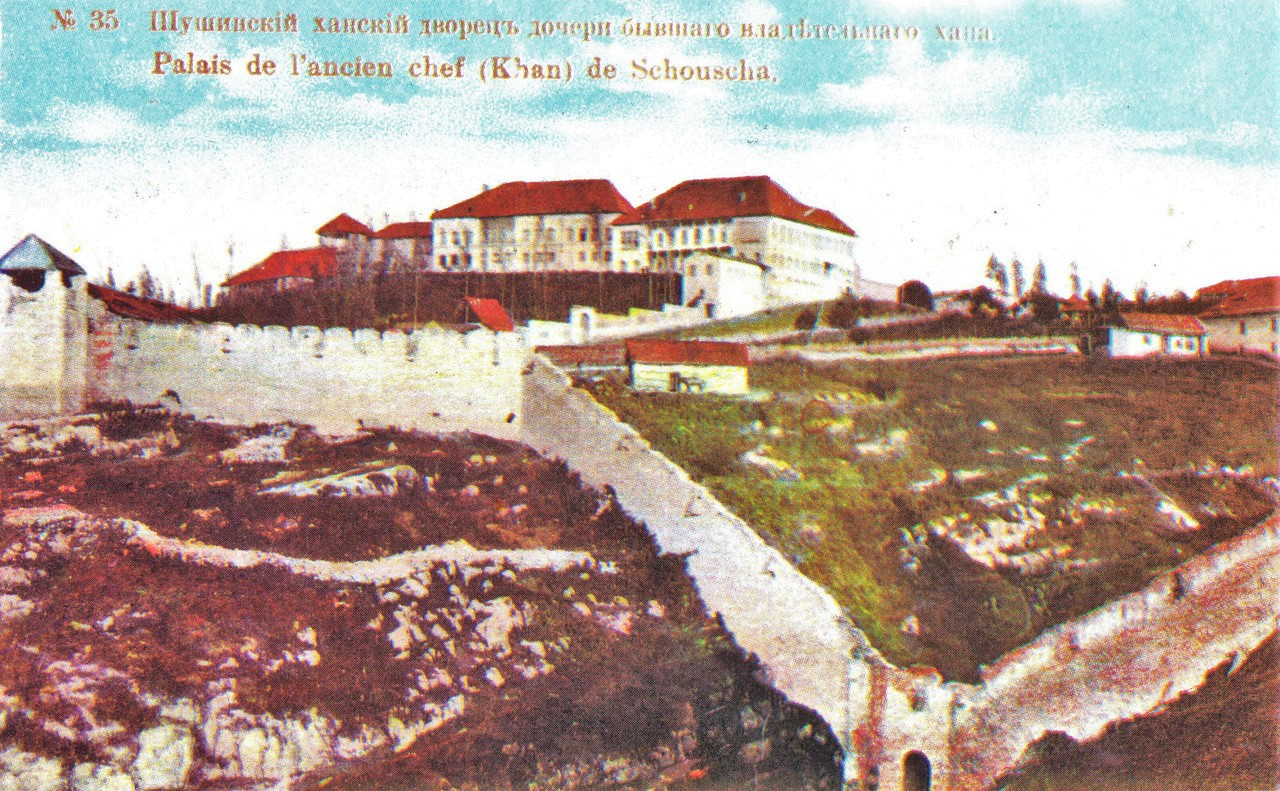
The Palace of Khurshidbanu Natavan, the daughter of the last ruler of Karabakh Khanate, late 19th-early 20th centuries

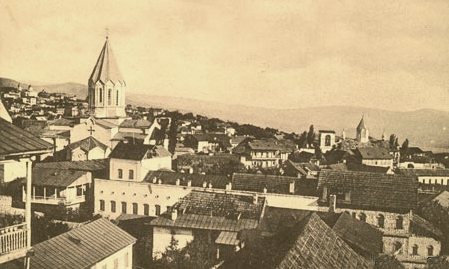
The Armenian quarters of Shusha – with the Ghazanchetsots Cathedral in the background – in the early 20th century, before their destruction by Azerbaijani military units in 1920

Some sources, including Mirza Jamal Javanshir, Mirza Adigozal bey, Abbasgulu Bakikhanov and Mirza Yusuf Nersesov, attest to the foundation of the town in 1750–1752 (according to other sources, 1756–1757) by Panah Ali Khan (r. 1748–1763), the founder and the first ruler of the Karabakh Khanate (1748–1822), which comprised both Lowland and Highland Karabakh. The mid-18th century foundation is supported by the second edition of the Encyclopaedia of Islam, and the Brockhaus and Efron Encyclopedic Dictionary.

According to Mirza Jamal Javanshir, the author of the Persian-language text History of Karabakh, one of the most significant chronicles on the history of Karabakh in 18th-19th centuries, the Karabakh nobility assembled to discuss the danger of invasion from Iran and told Panah Ali Khan, "We must build among the impassable mountains such an inviolable and inaccessible fort, so that no strong enemy could take it." Melik Shahnazar of Varanda, who was the first of the Armenian meliks (dukes) to accept the suzerainty of Panah Ali Khan and who would remain his loyal supporter, suggested a location for the new fortress. Thus, Panahabad-Shusha was founded.

According to Mirza Jamal Javanshir, before Panah Ali Khan constructed the fortress there were no buildings there and it was used as cropland and pasture by the people of the nearby village of Shoshi. Panah khan resettled to Shusha the population of Shahbulag and some nearby villages and built strong fortifications.

Another account is presented by Raffi (1835–1888), an Armenian novelist and historian, in his work The Princedoms of Khamsa, which asserts that the place where Shushi was built was desolate and uninhabited before Panah Ali Khan's arrival. He states, "[Panah-Ali Khan and Melik-Shahnazar of Varanda] soon completed the construction (1762) [of the fortress] and moved the Armenian population of the nearby village of Shosh, called also Shoshi, or Shushi into the fortress.″

=== Conflict with the Qajars ===
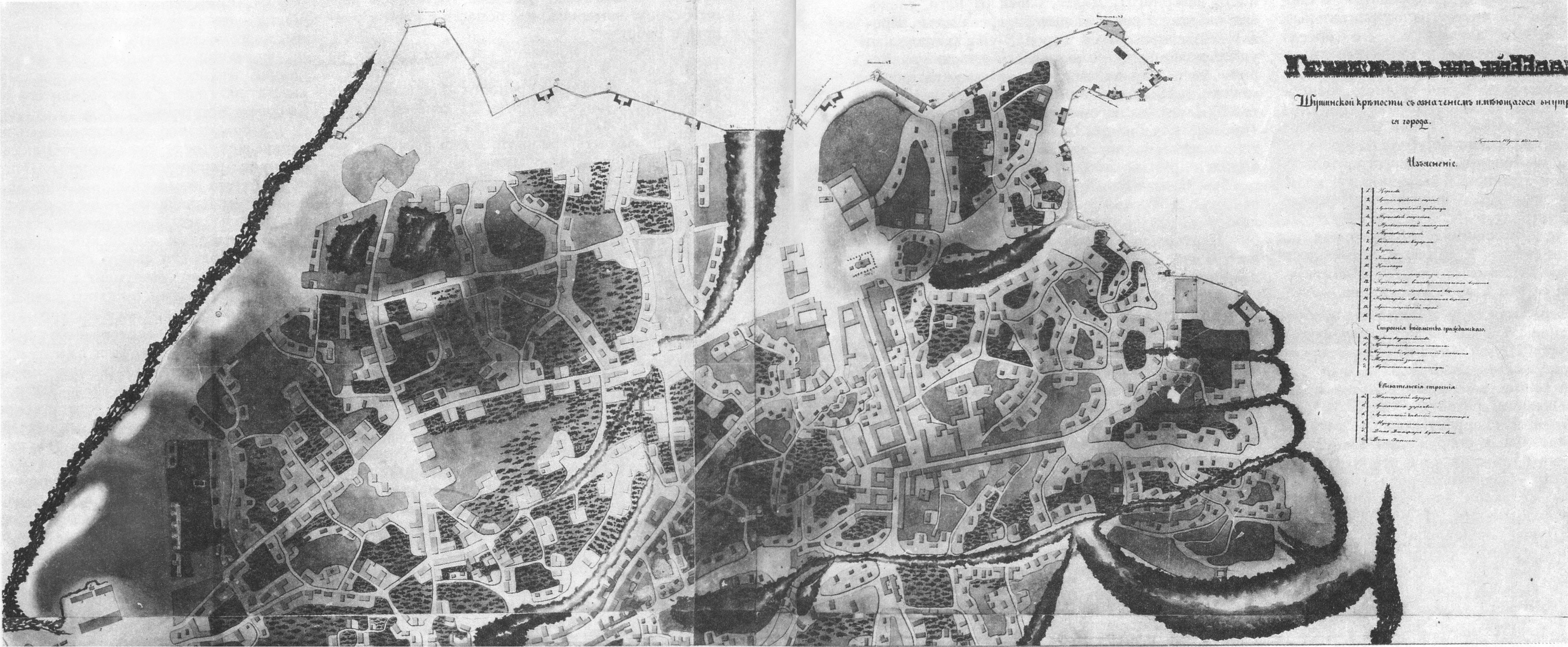
19th-century map

Although Panah Ali Khan had been in conflict with Nader Shah, the new ruler of Persia, Adil Shah, issued a firman (decree) recognizing Panah Ali as the Khan of Karabakh. Less than a year after Shusha was founded, the Karabakh Khanate was attacked by Mohammad Hassan Khan Qajar, one of the major claimants to the Iranian throne. During the Safavid Empire Karabakh was for almost two centuries ruled by Ziyad-oglu family of the clan of Qajars (of Turkic origin).

Muhammed Hassan Khan besieged Shusha (Panahabad at that time) but soon had to retreat because of the attack on his territory by his major opponent, Karim Khan Zand. His retreat was so hasty that he even left his cannons under the walls of Shusha fortress. Panah Ali Khan counterattacked the retreating troops of Mohammad Hassan khan and even briefly took Ardabil across the Aras River.

In 1756 (or 1759), Shusha and the Karabakh Khanate underwent a new attack from Fath-Ali Khan Afshar, ruler of Urmia. With his 30,000 strong army, Fath-Ali Khan also managed to gain support from the meliks of Jraberd and Talish (Gulistan), however, Melik Shahnazar of Varanda continued to support Panah Ali Khan. The Siege of Shusha lasted for six months and Fath-Ali Khan eventually had to retreat.

When Karim Khan Zand took control of much of Iran, he forced Panah Ali Khan to come to Shiraz (capital of Zand-ruled Iran), where he died as a hostage. Panah Ali Khan's son Ibrahim Khalil Khan was sent back to Karabakh as governor. Under him, the Karabakh Khanate became one of the strongest state formations and Shusha grew. According to travellers who visited Shusha at the end of 18th-early 19th centuries the town had about 2,000 houses and approximately 10,000 population.

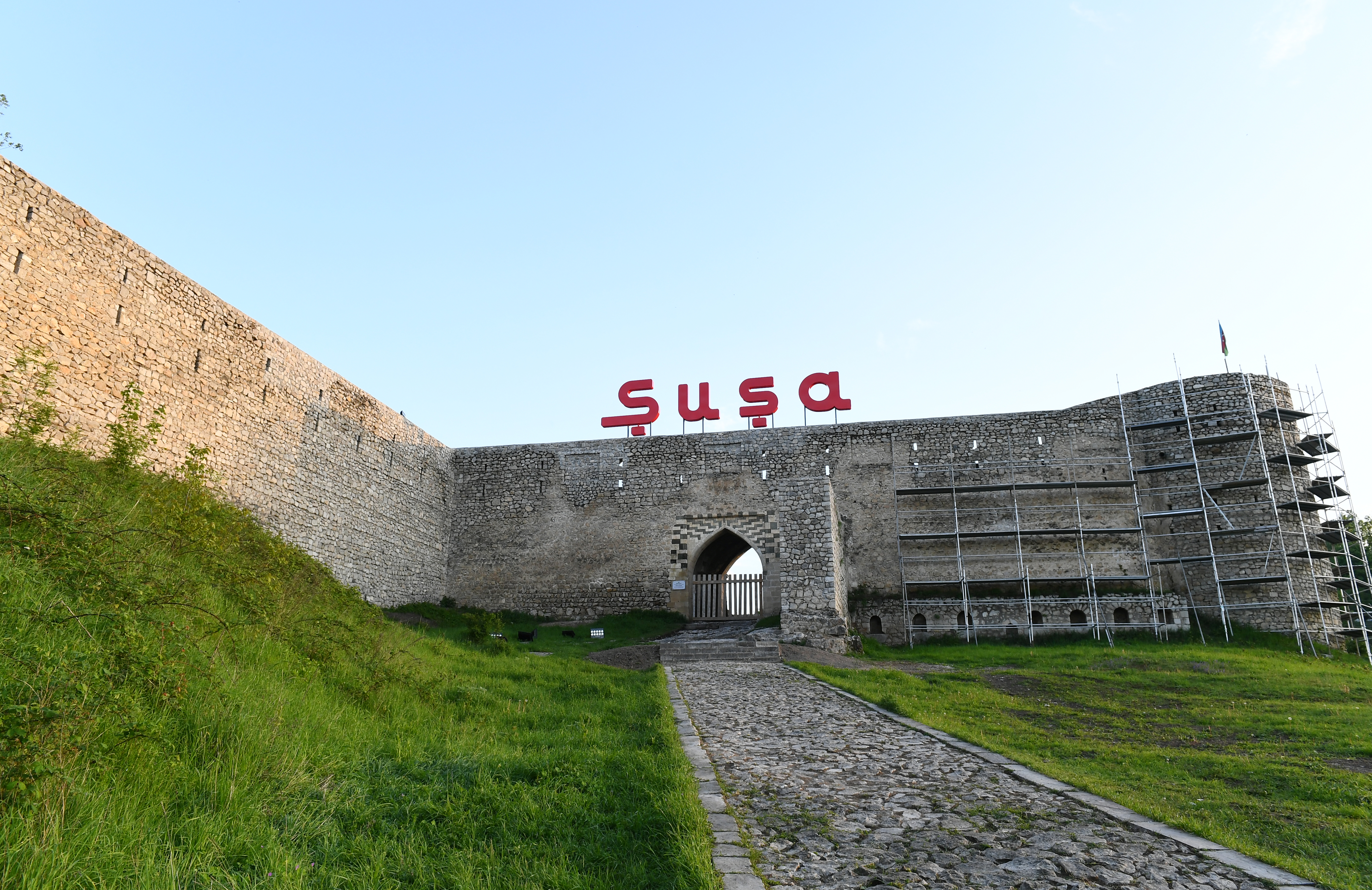
Shusha fortress in 2021

In summer 1795, Shusha was subjected to a major attack by Agha Mohammad Khan Qajar, son of Mohammad Hassan Khan who had attacked Shusha in 1752. Agha Mohammad Khan Qajar's goal was to end with the feudal fragmentation and to restore the old Safavid State in Iran. By early 1795, he had already secured mainland Iran and was directly afterwards poised to bring the entire Caucasus region back within the Iranian domains. For this purpose he also wanted to proclaim himself Shah of Iran. However, according to the Safavid tradition, the shah had to take control over the whole of South Caucasus and Dagestan before his coronation. Therefore, the Karabakh Khanate and its fortified capital Shusha were the first and major obstacle to achieve these ends.

Agha Mohammad Khan Qajar besieged Shusha with the centre part of a 70,000-strong army, after having crossed the Aras River. The right and left wings were sent to resubjugate Shirvan-Dagestan and Erivan respectively. Agha Mohammad Khan himself led the centre part of the main army, besieging Shusha between 8 July and 9 August 1795. Ibrahim Khalil khan mobilized the population for a long-term defence. The number of militia in Shusha reached 15,000. Women fought together with men. The Armenian population of Karabakh also actively participated in this struggle against the Iranians and fought side by side with the Muslim population, jointly organizing ambushes in the mountains and forests.

The siege lasted for 33 days. Not being able to capture Shusha, Agha Mohammad Khan ceased the siege and advanced to Tiflis (present-day Tbilisi), which despite desperate resistance was occupied and exposed to unprecedented destruction. Ibrahim Khalil Khan eventually surrendered to Mohammad Khan after negotiations, including the paying of regular tribute and to surrender hostages, although the Qajar forces were still denied entrance to Shusha. Since the main objective was Georgia, Mohammad Khan was willing to have Karabakh secured by this agreement for now, for he and his army subsequently moved further.

In 1797, Agha Mohammad Shah Qajar, having successfully resubjugated Georgia and the wider Caucasus and having declared himself shah, decided to carry out a second attack on Karabakh.

Trying to avenge his previous humiliating defeat, Agha Mohammad Shah devastated the surrounding villages near Shusha. The population had not recovered from the previous 1795 attack and also suffered from a serious drought which lasted for three years. The artillery of the attackers also inflicted serious losses on the city defenders. Thus, in 1797 Agha Mohammad Shah succeeded in seizing Shusha and Ibrahim Khalil Khan had to flee to Dagestan.

However, several days after the seizure of Shusha, Agha Mohammad Khan was killed in mysterious circumstances by his bodyguards in the town. Ibrahim Khalil Khan returned to Shusha and ordered that the shah's body be honourably buried until further instructions from the nephew and heir of Agha Mohammad Shah, Baba Khan, who soon assumed the title of Fath-Ali Shah. Ibrahim Khan, in order to maintain peaceful relations with Tehran and retain his position as the Khan of Karabakh, gave his daughter Agha Begom, known as Aghabaji, as one of the wives of the new shah.

=== Within the Russian Empire ===
From the early 19th century, Russian ambitions in the Caucasus to increase its territories at the expense of neighbouring Qajar Iran and Ottoman Turkey began to rise. Following the annexation of Georgia in 1801, some of the khanates agreed to become Russian protectorates in the immediate years afterwards. In 1804, the Russian general Pavel Tsitsianov directly invaded Qajar Iran, initiating the Russo-Persian War of 1804–1813. Amidst the war, in 1805, an agreement was made between the Karabakh Khanate and the Russian Empire on the transfer of the Karabakh Khanate to Russia during the war, but was not fully realized, as both parties were still at war and the Russians were unable to consolidate any effective control over Karabakh.

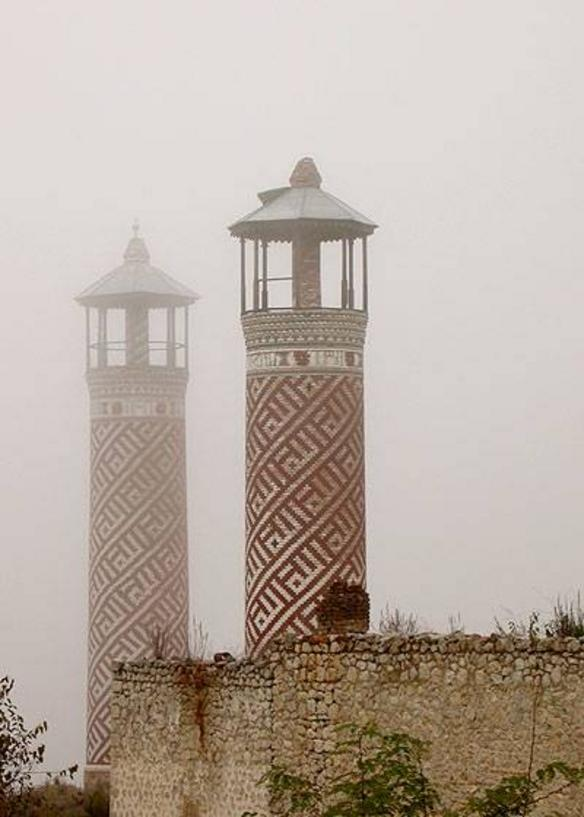
Ashaghi Govhar Agha Mosque, opened in 1876

The Russian Empire consolidated its power in the Karabakh Khanate following the Treaty of Gulistan in 1813, when Iran was forced to recognize the Karabakh Khanate, along most of the other khanates they possessed in the Caucasus, as belonging to Russia, comprising present-day Dagestan and most of the modern-day Republic of Azerbaijan, while officially ceding Georgia as well, thus irrevocably losing the greater part of its Caucasian territories. Absolute consolidation of Russian power over Karabakh and the recently conquered parts of the Caucasus from Iran were confirmed with the outcome of the Russo-Persian War of 1826–1828 and the ensuing Treaty of Turkmenchay of 1828.

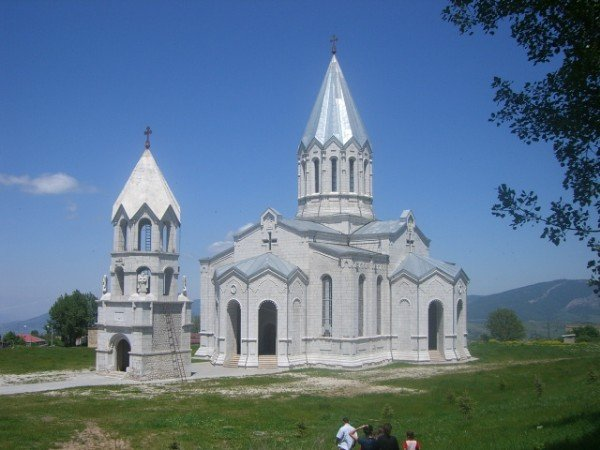
Ghazanchetsots Cathedral, opened in 1887

During the Russo-Persian War of 1826–1828, the citadel at Shusha held out for several months and never fell. After this Shusha ceased to be a capital of a khanate, which was dissolved in 1822, and instead became an administrative capital first of the Karabakh province (1822–1840), and then of the Shusha Uyezd of the Elisabethpol Governorate (1840–1923). Shusha grew and developed, with successive waves of migrants moving to the city, particularly Armenians, who formed a demographic majority in the surrounding highlands.

Beginning from the 1830s the town was divided into two parts: Turkic-speaking Muslims lived in the eastern lower quarters, while Armenian Christians settled in the relatively new western upper quarters of the town. The Muslim part of the town was divided into seventeen quarters. Each quarter had its own mosque, hammam (bathhouse) , water-spring and also a quarter representative, who would be elected from among the elders (aksakals) and would function similarly to the head of a modern-day municipality. The Armenian part of the town consisted of 12 quarters, five churches, a town and district school and a girls' seminary.

The population of the town primarily dealt with trade, horse-breeding, carpet-weaving and wine and vodka production. Shusha was also the biggest centre of silk production in the Caucasus. Most of the Muslim population of the town and of Karabakh, in general, was engaged in sheep and horse-breeding and therefore, had a semi-nomadic lifestyle, spending wintertime in lowland Karabakh in wintering pastures and spring and summer in summering pastures in Shusha and other mountainous parts.

In the 19th century, Shusha was one of the great cities of the Caucasus, larger and more prosperous than either Baku or Yerevan. Standing in the middle of a net of caravan routes, it had ten caravanserais. It was well known for its silk trade, its paved roads, brightly coloured carpets, big stone houses, and fine-bred horses. In 1824, George Keppel, the Earl of Albemarle, passed through the city. He found two thousand houses in the town, with three-quarters of the inhabitants Azerbaijanis and one-quarter Armenian. He furthermore noted regarding the town;

(...) The language is a dialect of the Turkish; but its inhabitants, with the exception of the Armenians, generally read and write Persian. The trade is carried on principally by the Armenians, between the towns of Sheki, Nakshevan, Khoi and Tabriz."

=== Early 20th century ===
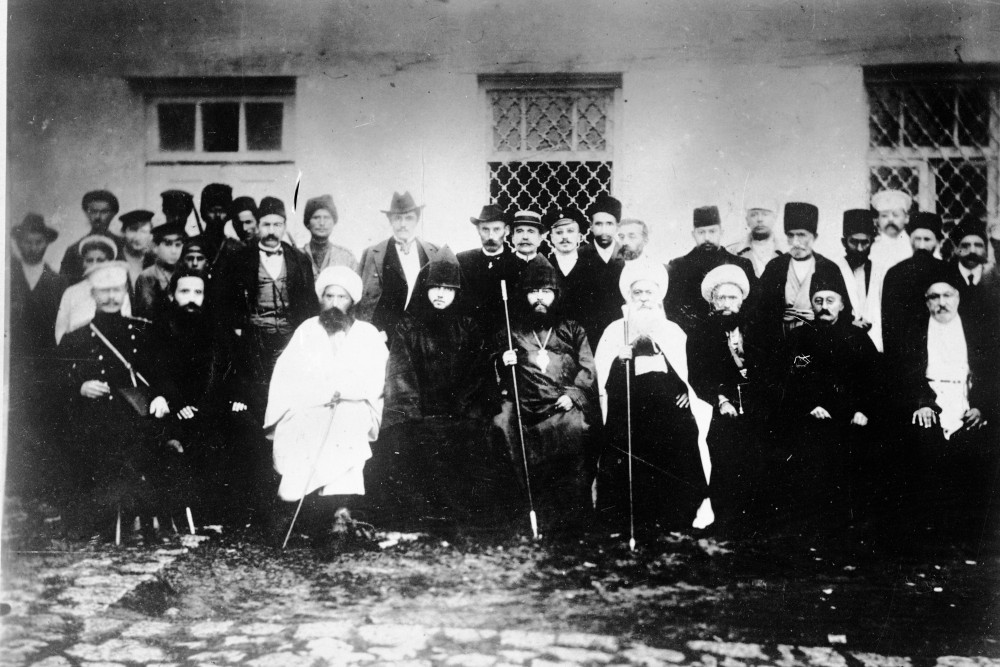
Karabakh reconciliation commission, composed of religious leaders and elders of both Armenian and Azerbaijani communities in Shusha in 1906–07

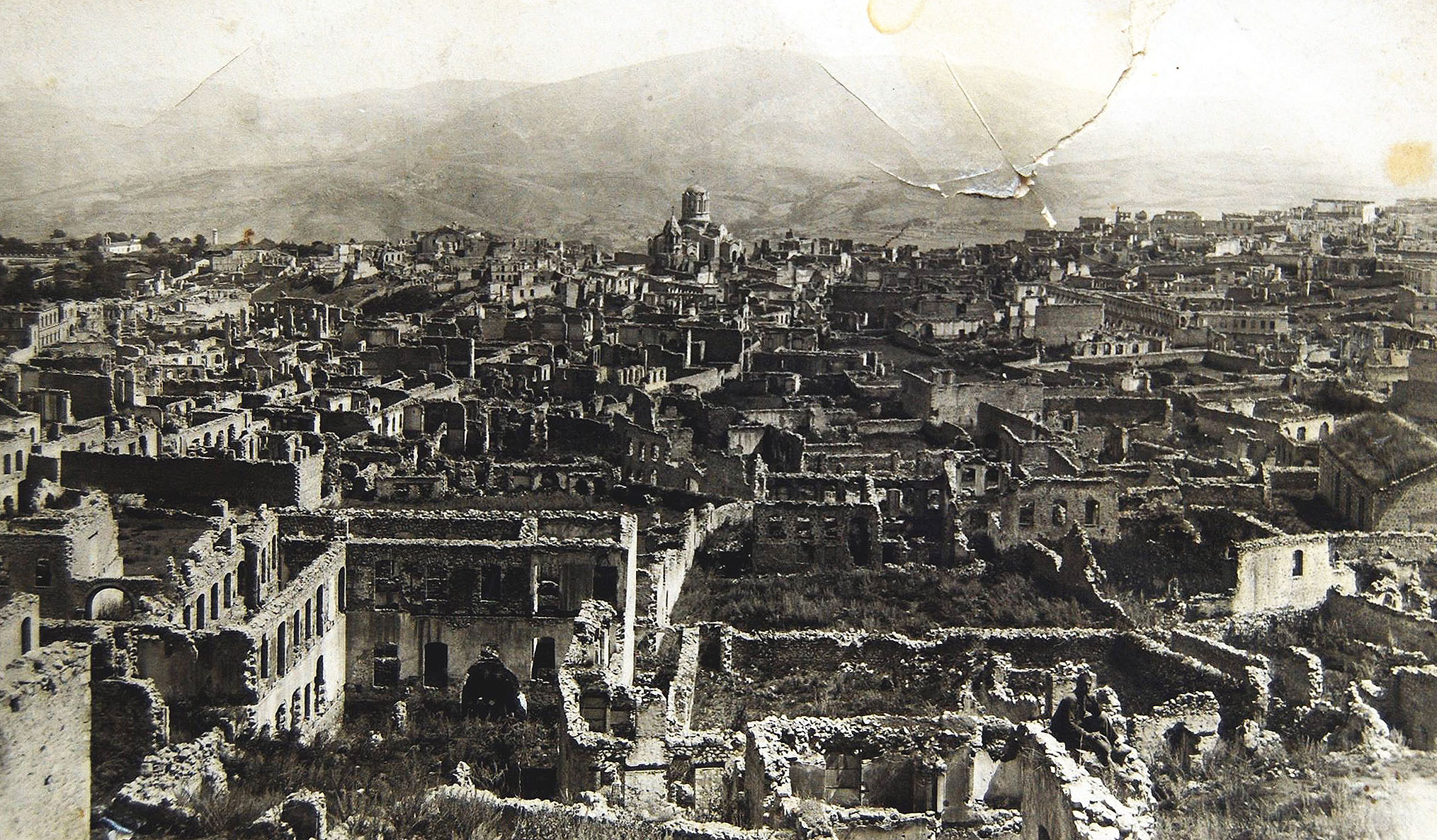
Armenian half of Shusha destroyed by Azerbaijani armed forces in 1920, with the defiled cathedral of the Holy Savior and Aguletsots church on the background

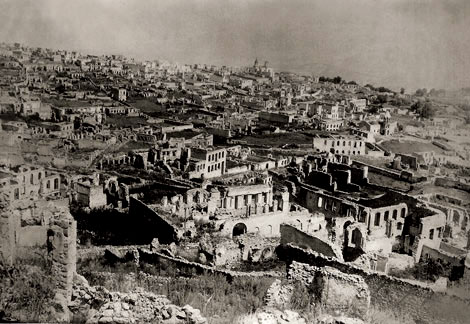
Ruins of the Armenian part of Shusha after the 1920 pogrom with the church of the Holy Mother of God "Kanach Zham" in the background

The beginning of the 20th century marked the first Armenian-Tartar clashes throughout Azerbaijan. This new phenomenon had two causes. Firstly, it was the result of increased tensions between the local Muslim population and Armenians, whose numbers increased throughout the 19th century as a result of Russian resettlement policies. Secondly, by the beginning of the 20th-century, the peoples of the Caucasus, similar to other non-Russian peoples in the periphery of the Russian Empire, began to seek cultural and territorial autonomy. Political instability within Russia, particularly the 1905 Revolution and 1917 Revolutions, caused these social movements to acquire the character of national liberation movements.

The initial clashes between ethnic Armenians and Azerbaijanis took place in Baku in February 1905. Soon, the conflict spilled over to other parts of the Caucasus, and on August 5, 1905, first conflict between the Armenian and Azerbaijani inhabitants of Shusha took place. As a result of the mutual pogroms and killings, hundreds of people died and more than 200 houses were burned.

After World War I and subsequent collapse of the Russian Empire, Karabakh was claimed by Azerbaijan to be part of the Azerbaijan Democratic Republic, a decision hotly disputed by neighbouring Armenia and by Karabakh's Armenian population, which claimed Karabakh as part of the First Republic of Armenia. With the capture of Baku, a small force of Turkish troops entered Shusha on 7 October 1918, also occupying the road to Aghdam. Whilst the Armenians of Shusha did not resist the Turks to avoid violence, the Turks with their limited troops were unable to seize the countryside of Karabakh which was held by an armed milita of local Armenians. After the defeat of Ottoman Empire in the World War I, Armenian forces under Andranik Ozanian defeated Azerbaijani forces under Khosrov bey Sultanov in Abdallyar (Lachin), and began heading down the Lachin corridor towards Shusha. Shortly before Andranik could arrive, British troops under General W. M. Thomson encouraged him to retreat, out of concerns that Armenian military activity could have an adverse effect on the region's status, which was to be decided at the 1919 Paris Peace Conference. Trusting Thomson, Andranik left, and British troops occupied Karabakh. The British command provisionally affirmed Sultanov (appointed by the Azerbaijani government) as the governor-general of Karabakh and Zangezur, pending the final decision by the Paris Peace Conference.

Ethnic conflict began to erupt in the region. Оn 5 June 1919, 600 Armenian inhabitants of the villages surrounding Shusha were massacred by Azerbaijani and Kurdish irregulars. Sultanov stated that the irregulars were not under his control. In August 1919, the Karabakh National Council was forced to enter into a provisional treaty agreement with the Azerbaijani government, recognizing the authority of the Azerbaijan government until the issue of the mountainous part of Karabakh was settled at the Paris Peace Conference. Despite signing the agreement, the Azerbaijani government continuously violated the terms of the treaty, and Sultanov employed severe measures against them, such as terror, blockade and famine. Sultanov gathered troops in the region and on 19 February 1920 issued an ultimatum to the Armenians, demanding they accept unconditional unification with Azerbaijan, and then massacred the population of several Armenian villages, including Khankendi (Stepanakert). A minority of Karabagh National Council representatives gathered in Shusha to accept Sultanov's demands, while the rest met in nearby Shushikend to reject the ultimatum. The strife culminated in an Armenian uprising, which was suppressed by the Azerbaijani army. In late March 1920, the Armenian half of the police forces was reported by a British journalist to have murdered the Azerbaijani half during the latter's traditional Novruz Bayram holiday celebrations. The Armenian surprise attack was organised and coordinated by the forces of the Armenian Republic. Azerbaijani outrage for this surprise attack ultimately led to the massacre and expulsion of the Armenian population in March 1920, in which 500–8,000 to 20,000 Armenians were killed, others were forced to flee, and the Armenian half of the city, 1,675 of 1,700 homes, were destroyed. A report from Dashnak archives states that 8,000 Armenians escaped from the city, whilst 5,000–6,000 remained behind.

According to the description of an Azerbaijani communist Ojahkuli Musaev:

… the ruthless destruction of defenceless women, children, old women, old men, etc has begun. Armenians were exposed to mass slaughter. … beautiful Armenian girls were raped, then shot. … By the order of … Khosrov-bek Sultanov; the pogroms proceeded for more than six days. Houses in the Armenian part have been partially demolished, plundered and reduced all to ashes, everyone led away women to submit to the wishes of executioner musavatists. During these historically artful forms of punishment, Khosrov-bek Sultanov, spoke about holy war (jihad) in his speeches to the Moslems, and called on them to finally finish the Armenians of the city of Shusha, not sparing women, children, etc.

Nadezhda Mandelstam wrote about Shusha in the 1930s, "in this town, which formerly of course was healthy and with every amenity, the picture of catastrophe and massacres was terribly visual. ... They say after the massacres all the wells were full of dead bodies. ... We didn't see anyone in the streets on the mountain. Only in downtown—in the market-square, there were a lot of people, but there wasn't any Armenian among them; all were Muslims".

=== Soviet era ===
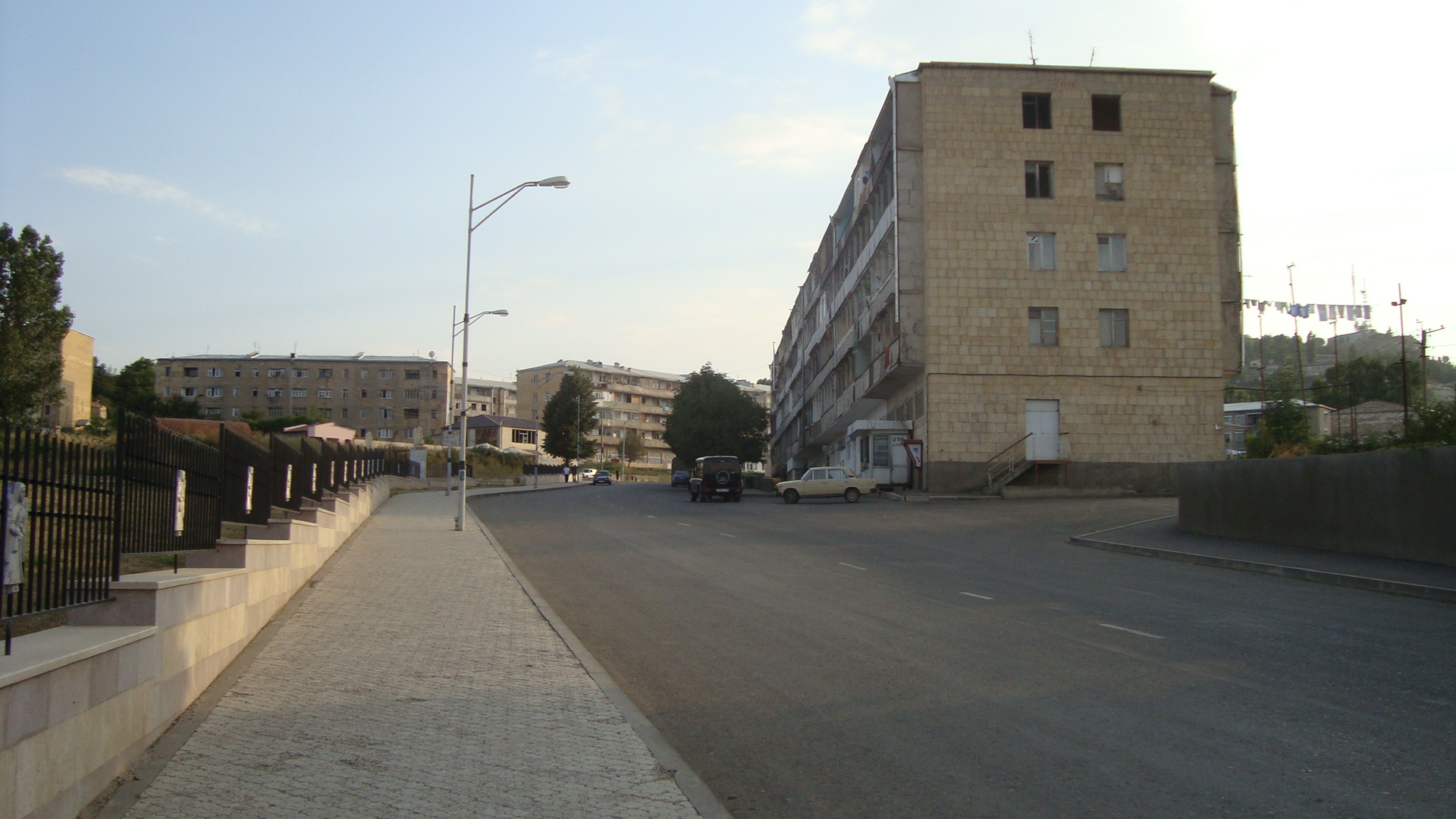
View from the town

In 1920, the Bolshevik 11th Red Army invaded Azerbaijan and then Armenia and put an end to the national de facto governments that existed in those two countries. Thereafter, the conflict for the control of Karabakh entered the diplomatic sphere. To attract Armenian public support, the Bolsheviks promised to resolve the issue of the disputed territories, including Karabakh, in favour of Armenia. However, on July 5, 1921, the Kavbiuro of the Communist Party adopted the following decision regarding the future status of Karabakh: "Proceeding from the necessity of national peace among Muslims and Armenians and of the economic ties between upper (mountainous) and lower Karabakh, of its permanent ties with Azerbaijan, mountainous Karabakh is to remain within AzSSR, receiving wide regional autonomy with the administrative centre in Shusha, which is to be included in the autonomous region." As a result, the Mountainous Karabakh Autonomous Region was established within the Azerbaijan SSR in 1923. A few years later, Stepanakert, named after the Armenian communist leader Stepan Shaumyan, became the new regional capital of the Nagorno-Karabakh Autonomous Oblast and soon became its largest town.

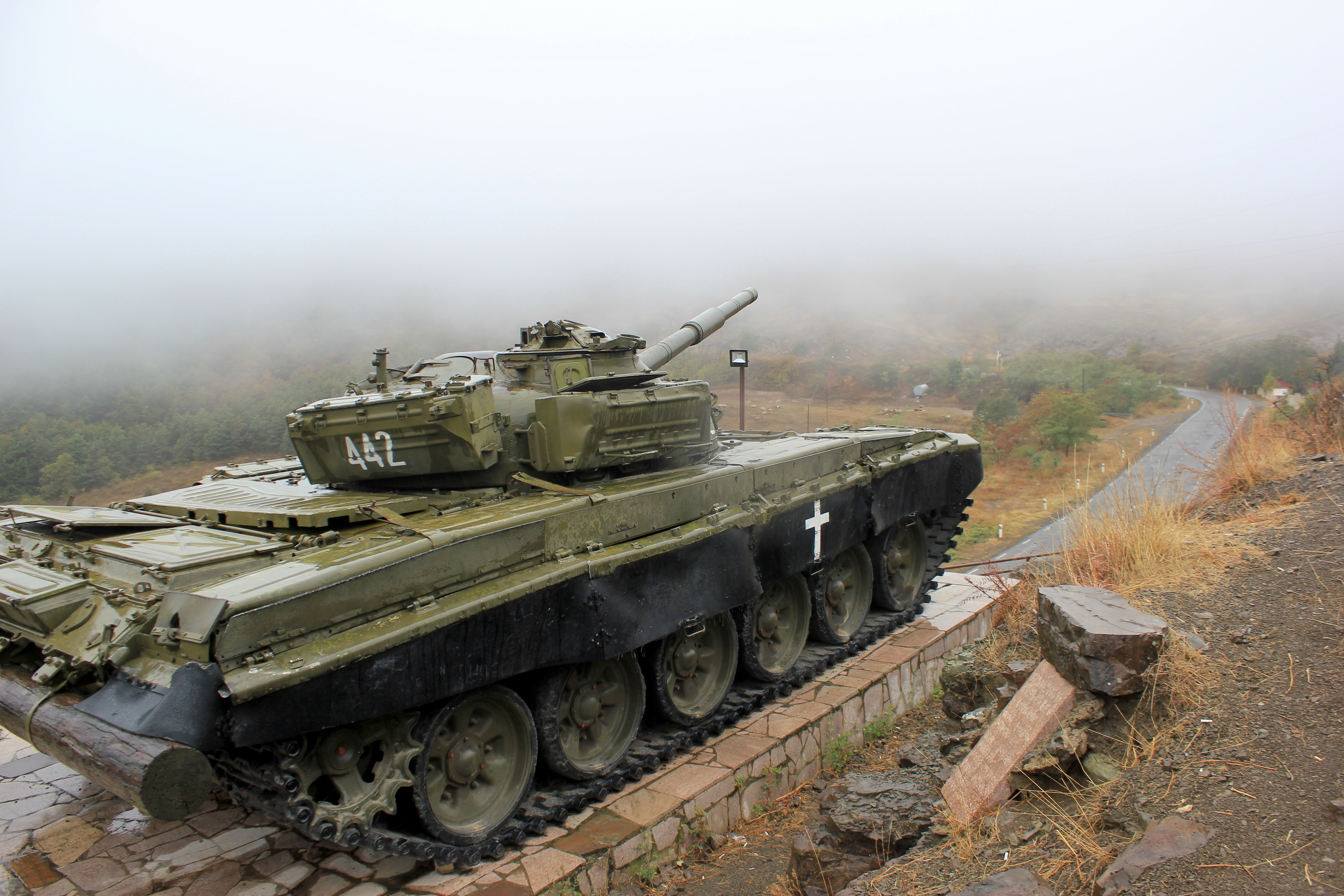
A T-72 tank that stood as a memorial commemorating the capture of Shusha by the Armenian forces until it was removed in 2023

The decision make Nagorno-Karabakh an autonomous region within Azerbaijan is frequently attributed to Joseph Stalin, who was Commissar of Nationalities at the time, purportedly with the purpose of ensuring Moscow's position as power broker between the Armenian and Azerbaijani SSRs. Stalin participated in the Kavbiuro's meetings on the issue of Nagorno-Karabakh but did not vote.

The town remained half-ruined until the 1960s when the town began to gradually revive due to its recreational potential. In 1977 the Shusha State Historical and Architectural Reserve was established and the town became one of the major resort-towns in the former USSR.

The Armenian quarter continued to lie in ruins until the beginning of the 1960s. In 1961, Baku's communist leadership finally passed a decision to clear away much of the ruins, even though many old buildings still could have been renovated. Three Armenian and one Russian church were demolished and the Armenian part of the town was built up with plain buildings typical of the Khrushchev era.

=== Nagorno-Karabakh conflict ===
==== 1988–1994 Nagorno-Karabakh war ====
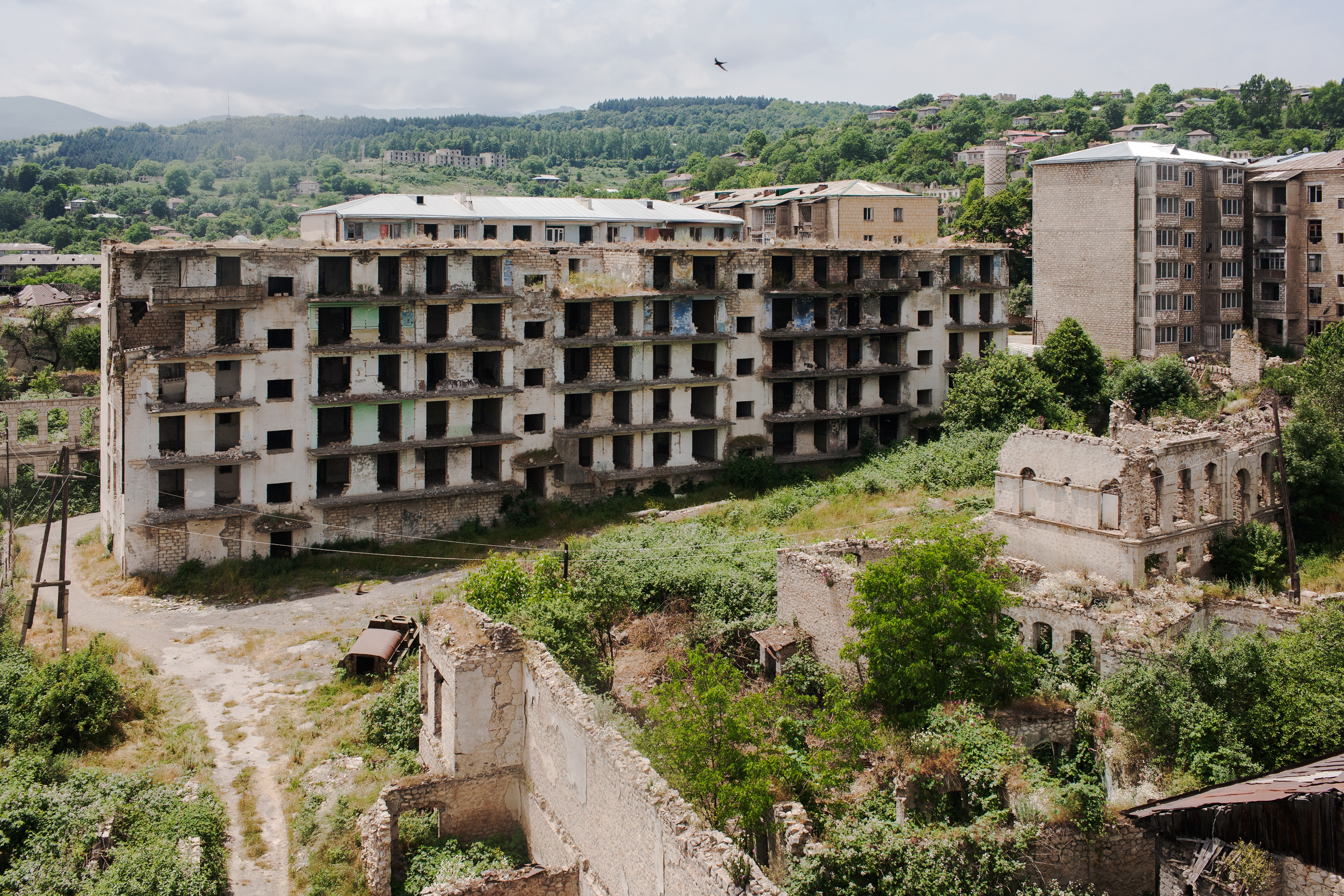
Part of Shusha in ruins in 2010

With the start of the First Nagorno-Karabakh War in 1988 Shusha became the most important Azerbaijani stronghold in Karabakh, from where Azerbaijani forces constantly shelled the capital Stepanakert for half a year, leading to hundreds of Armenian civilian casualties and causing mass destruction in Stepanakert. On May 9, 1992, the town was captured by Armenian forces in an operation to lift the siege of Stepanakert and the Azerbaijani population fled. According to Armenian commander Arkady Ter-Tadevosyan, the city was looted and burnt by Armenian citizens from nearby Stepanakert, who had endured months of bombing and shelling from Azerbaijani forces. He also noted it was part of a Karabakh Armenian superstition of burning houses to prevent the enemy from returning. A British journalist witnessed Armenian soldiers using minarets of a mosque in Shusha as shooting targets. As of 2002, ten years later after the city's capture by the Armenian forces, some 80% of the town was in ruins. Armenians also dismantled and sold off historic dark bronze busts of three Azerbaijani musicians and poets from Shusha. Another British journalist who visited Shusha in 1997 reported that the gravestones in the Azerbaijani cemetery on the edge of town were "methodically smashed and vandalised".

After the end of the war, the town was repopulated by Armenians, mostly refugees from Azerbaijan and other parts of Karabakh, as well as members of the Armenian diaspora. The population of the town was significantly less than the pre-war number, and the demographic of the town had changed from mostly Azerbaijani to completely Armenian. The Goris-Stepanakert Highway passes through the town and is a transit and tourist destination for many. There were some hotels in the city, and cultural monuments such as the Ghazanchetsots Cathedral and the Yukhari Govhar Agha Mosque were restored by Armenian authorities.

After the war, a T-72 tank commanded by the Karabakhi Armenian Gagik Avsharian was placed as a memorial. The tank had been hit during the town's capture, killing the driver and gun operator, but Avsharian jumped free from the hatch. The tank was restored and its number, 442, repainted in white on the side. After the Azerbaijani offensive in Nagorno-Karabakh in September 2023 the tank was removed by the Azerbaijani authorities and transferred to the Military Trophy Park in Baku.

==== 2020 Nagorno-Karabakh war ====
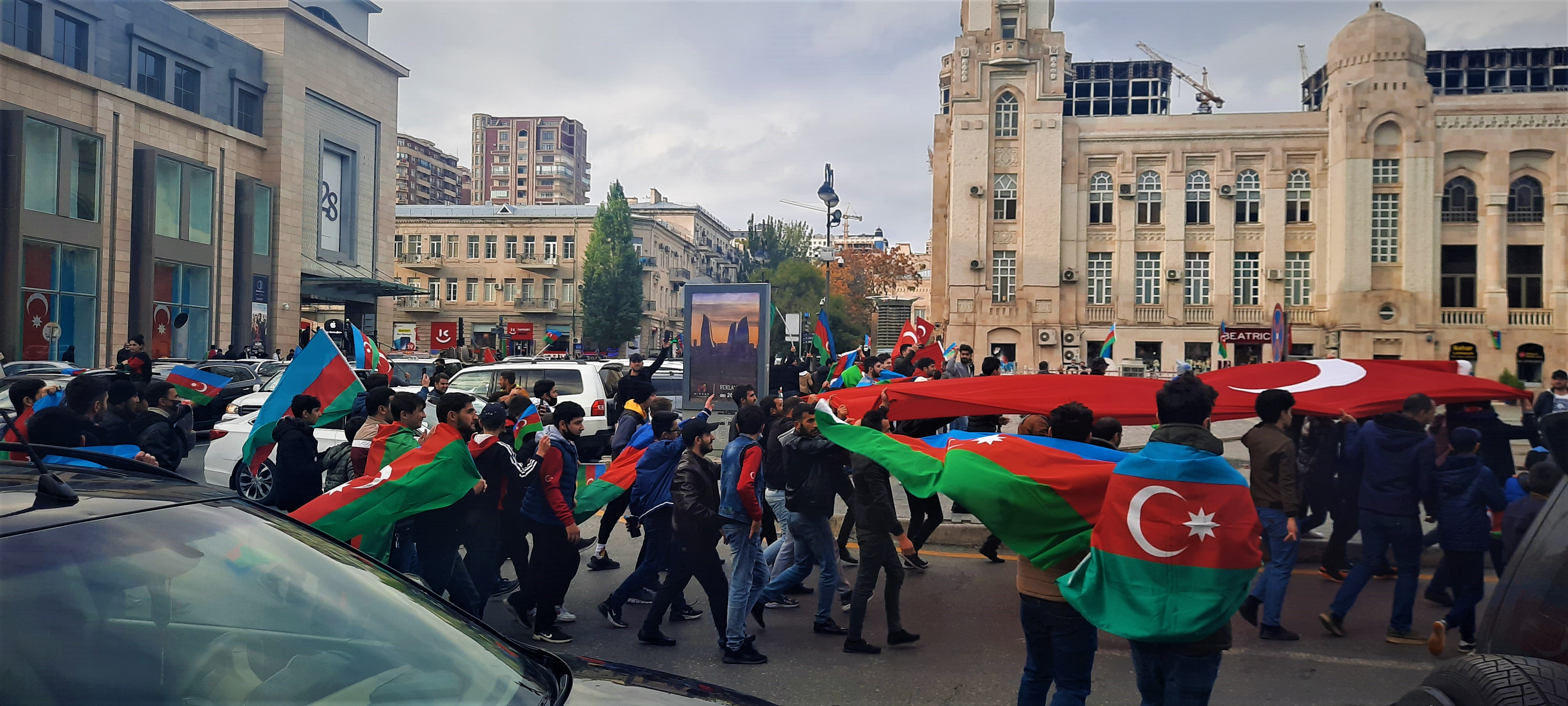
Celebrations in Baku, Azerbaijan on 8 November.

During the 2020 Nagorno-Karabakh war, Armenia accused the Azerbaijani army of shelling civilian areas and the city's Ghazanchetsots Cathedral. Three journalists were wounded while they were inside the cathedral to film the destruction of a previous shelling on the same day. The Azerbaijani Ministry of Defence denied the shelling of the cathedral by stating that "destruction of the church in Shusha has nothing to do with the activities of the Army of Azerbaijan" The House of Culture was also badly damaged in the fighting.

On November 8, 2020, Azerbaijani President Ilham Aliyev announced that the Azerbaijani army took control of the city of Shusha. The next day, the Azerbaijani Ministry of Defence released a video from the city, confirming full Azerbaijani control. On the same day, Artsakh authorities confirmed that they had lost control of Shusha. A ceasefire signed two days later reaffirmed Azerbaijan's gains, resulting in the city staying under its control. The Armenian government and the Armenian Apostolic Church subsequently claimed that Azerbaijani soldiers had vandalised Armenian churches and cultural landmarks, including Ghazanchetsots Cathedral and Kanach Zham, which was supported by reports from FreedomHouse and CaucasusHeritageWatch. Azerbaijani officials claimed that the Mamayi Mosque and a nearby fountain was vandalised by Armenian forces. In August 2023, a mass grave was found in Shusha prison. In total 17 corpses with signs of torture were exhumed.

=== Reconstruction and revival (2020–present) ===
Since 2022, the Shusha Global Media Forum has been held in the city.

== Culture ==
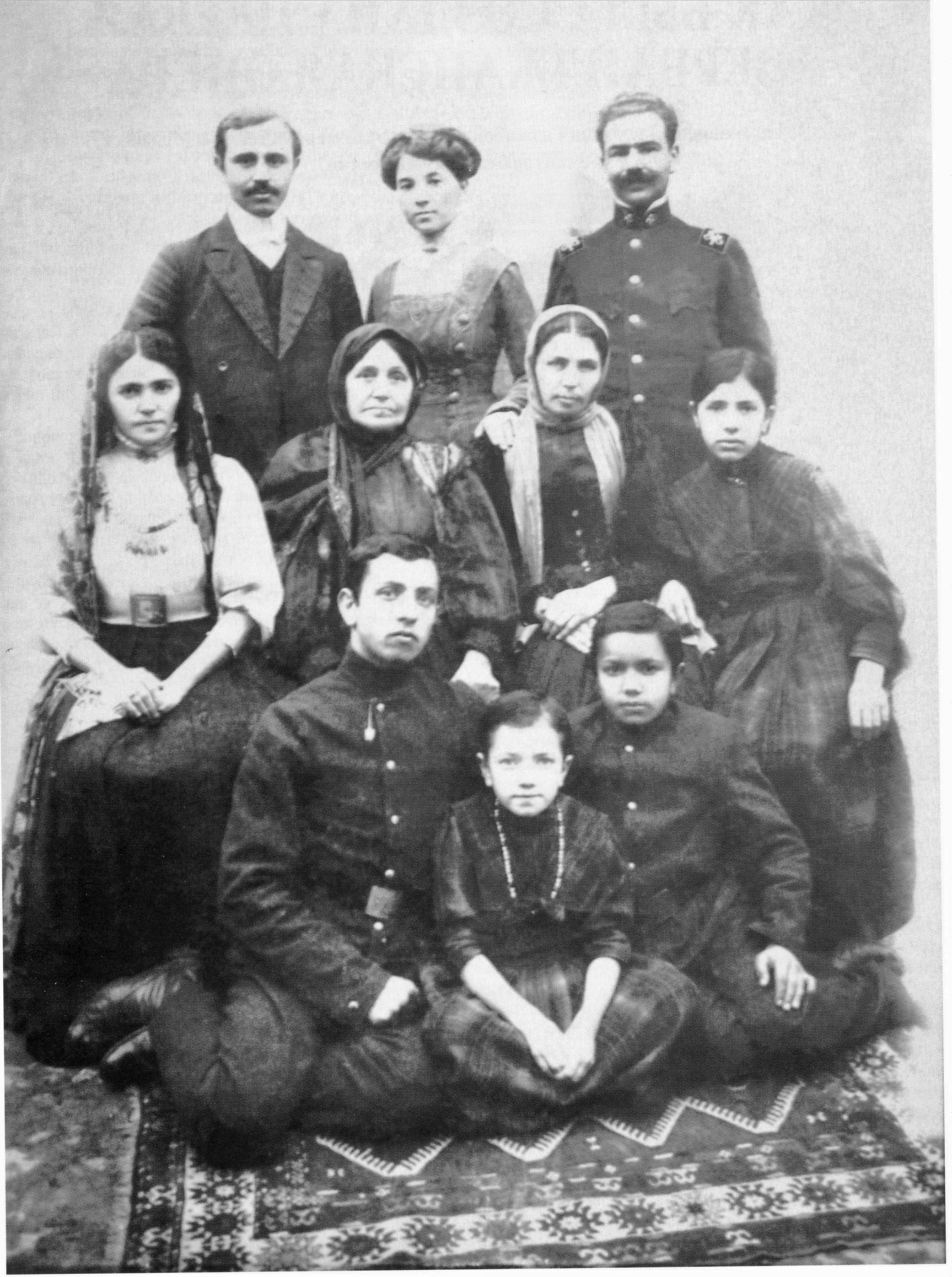
Azerbaijani composer Uzeyir Hajibeyov (top left) with his family in Shusha, 1915

Shusha contains both Armenian and Azerbaijani cultural monuments, while the surrounding territories also include many ancient Armenian villages.

Shusha is often considered the cradle of Azerbaijan's music and poetry and one of the leading centres of the Azerbaijani culture, having been declared the cultural capital of Azerbaijan in January 2021. The city is particularly renowned for its traditional Azerbaijani genre of vocal and instrumental arts called mugham. For the Azerbaijanis, Shusha is the "conservatoire of the Caucasus". Khurshidbanu Natavan, Azerbaijan's most famous woman poet, composer Uzeyir Hajibeyov, opera singer Bulbul and one of Azerbaijan's first twentieth-century novelists, Yusif Vezir Chemenzeminli, were born here. Molla Panah Vagif, a prominent Azerbaijani poet and vizier of the Karabakh khanate, lived and died in Shusha. Vagif Poetry Days were held in Shusha annually since 1982. The tradition was resumed in 2021.

Shusha is also a historical Armenian religious and cultural center. The Armenian population of the town historically had four main churches, each named after the place of origin of the Armenian inhabitants: Ghazanchetsots (after Qazançı; officially named Holy Savior Cathedral), Aguletsos Holy Mother of God Church (after Agulis), Meghretsots Holy Mother of God Church (after Meghri), and Gharabakhtsots (after the region of Karabakh; the church is better known as Kanach Zham). Shusha was also home to a monastery complex called Kusanats Vank ("Virgins' Monastery") or Anapat Kusanats ("Virgins' Hermitage")․ In 1989, Ghazanchetsots Cathedral was made the seat of the newly reestablished Diocese of Artsakh of the Armenian Apostolic Church.

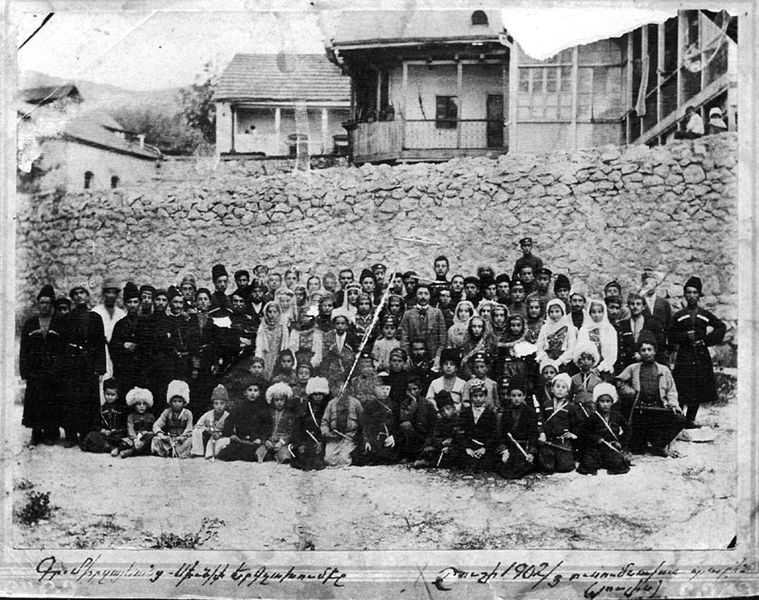
Armenian composer Grikor Mirzaian Suni with his chorus in Shushi (1902)

Shusha serves an important role in the history of Armenian music, being the hometown and headquarters of Armenian composer Grikor Suni and his chorus. Suni was an instrumental figure in establishing the national identity of Armenian music and considered one of the many founders of modern Armenian music. In addition, the Khandamirian or Shushi theater which opened in 1891 would become regionally famous for its important contributions to the Armenian cultural arts, especially music. In the Khandamirian theater, Suni gave his first ever performance. By 1902, Suni had organized his Oriental Cultural Ensemble in Shusha and had their first big concert which would get them in trouble with Russian authorities forcing the ensemble out of Shusha where they went on to spread Armenian cultural music around the world. Shusha was also the hometown of Arev Baghdasaryan, the prominent Armenian singer, dancer, and People's Artist of the Armenian SSR.

Shusha is also well known for sileh rugs, floor coverings from the South Caucasus. Those from the Caucasus may have been woven in the vicinity of Shusha. A similar Eastern Anatolian type usually shows a different range of colours.

In November 2020, the organizers of the Turkvision Song Contest stated that they were exploring the possibility of holding the contest's 2021 version in Shusha, and in January 2021, the Azerbaijani Ministry of Culture started preparatory activities on the Khari Bulbul Festival and Days of the Poetry of Vagif.

=== Museums ===
During the Soviet period, Shusha was home to museums such as the Shusha Museum of History, the house museum of Azerbaijani composer Uzeyir Hajibeyov, the house museum of the Azerbaijani singer Bulbul, and the Shusha Carpet Museum. The Azerbaijan State Museum of History of Karabakh was founded in Shusha in 1991 shortly before the outbreak of the First Nagorno-Karabakh War.

While the city was under Armenian control, a number of museums were operated there: the State Museum of Fine Arts, G. A. Gabrielyants State Geological Museum, the Shushi History Museum, the Shushi Carpet Museum and the Shushi Art Gallery.

The Shushi History Museum is located in a 19th-century mansion, in the centre of the historical quarter, and had a collection of artefacts related to Shusha from ancient to modern times. The collection of the museum contains many ethnographic materials, including the goods of local masters. The museum contains household articles, photographs, and reproductions illustrating life of 19th-century inhabitants of Shusha. There are also sections dedicated to the 1920 Shusha Massacre and the capture of Shusha by Armenian forces in 1992. The G. A. Gabrielyants State Geological Museum, named after and created by Armenian geologist Grigori Gabrielyants, was opened in the building of Taza Mahalla Mosque in Shusha in 2014. It contains 480 samples of ore and fossil from 47 countries of the world.

Except for the rugs kept at the Shushi Carpet Museum, which were removed, the collections of the museums in Shusha were left behind and remained in the city after the capture of Shusha by Azerbaijani forces in 2020.

In August 2021, satellite images released by Caucasus Heritage Watch (a watchdog group of researchers from Purdue and Cornell) revealed that between April 10 and June 5, 51 sculptures in the park of the Museum of Fine Arts were removed and the area completely cleared: "CHW is concerned about the condition of these artworks, which are the property of that museum. CHW asks Azerbaijani authorities to disclose the location of the confiscated sculptures and plans for public access" read the Facebook page of the organization.

== Demographics ==
Historical population and ethnic composition of Shusha
Year	Armenians		Azerbaijanis		Others		Total
1823	421	27.5%	1,111	72.5%			1,532
1830	762	44.2%	963	55.8%			1,725
1851							15,194
1885	14,000	46.7%	16,000	53.3%			30,000
1886	15,188	56.7%	11,595	43.3%	23	0.1%	26,806
1897	14,420	55.7%	10,778	41.6%	683	2.6%	25,881
1904		56.5%		43.2%			25,656
1908							37,591
1910							39,413
1914	22,416	52.7%	18,836	44.3%	1,316	3.1%	42,568 (Note: Also appears as 42,586 in the list of populated places in the Caucasus.)
1916	23,396	53.3%	19,091	43.5%	1,382	3.2%	43,869
March 1920: Massacre and expulsion of Armenian population by Azerbaijan
1921	289	3.1%	8,894	96.4%	40	0.4%	9,223
1923	209	3.0%	6,682	95.9%	74	1.1%	6,965
1926	93	1.8%	4,900	96.4%	111	2.2%	5,104
1931							5,291
1939	1,476	27.2%	3,701	68.2%	247	4.5%	5,424
1959	1,428	23.3%	4,453	72.8%	236	3.9%	6,117
1970	1,540	17.7%	6,974	80.2%	179	2.1%	8,693
1979	1,409	13.1%	9,216	85.5%	159	1.5%	10,784
September 1988: Nagorno-Karabakh conflict: Expulsion of Armenian population
1989							15,039
May 1992: Capture by Armenian forces. Expulsion of Azerbaijani population
2005	3,105	100%					3,105
2009	3,900	100%					3,900
2015	4,064	100%					4,064
November 2020: Capture by Azerbaijani forces. Exodus of Armenian population
2024			At least 131	100%			At least 131

According to the first Russian-held census of 1823 conducted by Russian officials Yermolov and Mogilevsky, in Shusha were 1,111 (72.5%) Muslim families and 421 (27.5%) Armenian families. Seven years later, according to 1830 data, the number of Muslim families in Shusha decreased to 963 (55.8%) and the number of Armenian families increased to 762 (44.2%).

George Keppel, the Earl of Albemarle, who wrote on his way back to England from India arrived in Karabakh from Persia in 1824, wrote that “Sheesha contains two thousand houses: three parts of the inhabitants are Tartars (i.e. Azerbaijanis), and the remainder Armenians”.

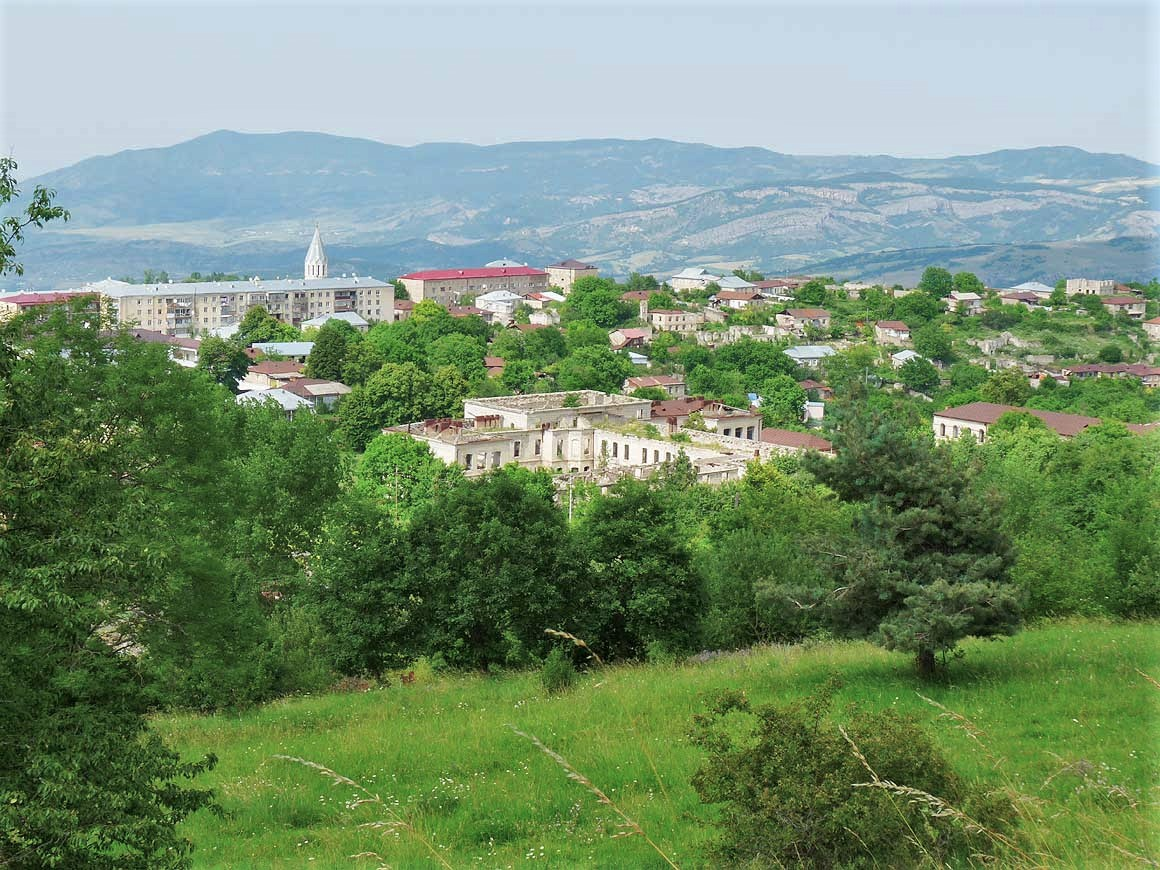
Shusha in 2015

A survey prepared by the Russian imperial authorities in 1823 shows that all Armenians of Karabakh compactly resided in its highland portion, i.e. on the territory of the five traditional Armenian principalities, and constituted an absolute demographic majority on those lands. The survey's more than 260 pages recorded that the five districts had 57 Armenian villages and seven Tatar villages.

The 19th century also brought some alterations to the ethnic demographics of the region. Following the invasions from Iran (Persia), Russo-Persian wars and subjection of Karabakh khanate to Russia, many Muslim families emigrated to Iran while many Armenians moved to Shusha.

In 1851, the population of Shusha was 15,194 people, in 1885 – 30,000, and in 1910 – 39,413.

By the end of the 1880s, the percentage of the Muslim population living in the Shusha district (part of the earlier Karabakh province) decreased even further and constituted only 41.5%, while the percentage of the Armenian population living in the same district increased to 58.2% in 1886.

By the second half of the 19th century, Shusha had become the largest town in the Karabakh region. However, after the pogrom against the Armenian population in 1920 and the burning of the town, out-migration, and its decreasing economic importance in relation to other regional cities like Yerevan and Baku, Shusha was reduced to a small provincial town of some 10,000 people. Its population afterward progressively dropped year by year, reaching 5,104 by 1926. Armenians did not begin to return until after World War II. It was not until the 1960s that the Armenian quarter began to be rebuilt.

According to the last population census in 1989, the town of Shusha had a population of 17,000 and Shusha district had a population of 23,000. 91.7% of the population of Shusha district and 98% of Shusha town were Azerbaijani.

Following the capture of Shusha by the Armenian forces in 1992, the Azerbaijani population of the town, consisting of 15,000 people, was killed and expulsed. Before the 2020 Nagorno-Karabakh War, the population consisted of over 4,000 Armenians, mainly refugees from Baku, and other parts of Karabakh and Azerbaijan. As a result of the first war, no Azerbaijanis live in Shusha today, although Azerbaijani authorities plan to repopulate it with Azerbaijani displaced persons who fled Shusha during the first war. Shusha's Armenian population fled shortly before the city was recaptured by Azerbaijani forces during the 2020 Nagorno-Karabakh War.

== Economy and tourism ==
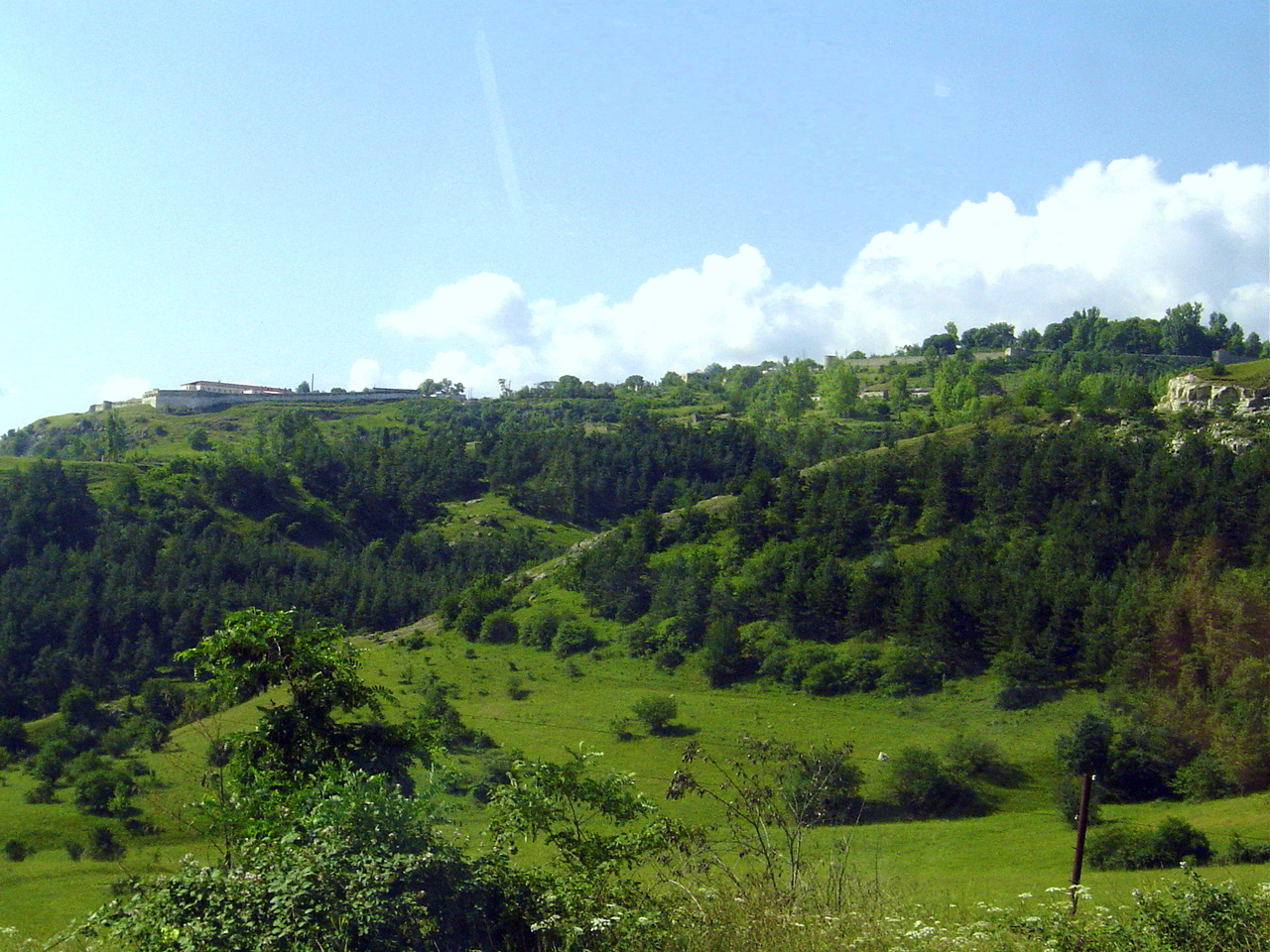
Shusha as seen from the road approaching the town

While the town was under Armenian control, there were efforts to revive the city's economy by the Shushi Revival Fund, the ArmeniaFund, and by the government of Artsakh. Investment in tourism led to the opening of the Shushi Hotel, the Avan Shushi Plaza Hotel and the Shushi Grand Hotel. A tourist information office was also opened, the first in the Republic of Artsakh. The two remaining Armenian churches (Ghazanchetsots and Kanach Zham) were renovated, and schools, museums and the Naregatsi Arts Institute have opened.

After retaking the town, Azerbaijani authorities renovated and inaugurated Khari Bulbul and Karabakh hotels. In August 2021, Azerbaijani President Ilham Aliyev laid foundation stone for Hotel and Conference Center in Shusha.

== Twin towns – sister cities ==
- Gyöngyös, Hungary
- Andong, South Korea
- Kayseri, Turkey
- Turkistan, Kazakhstan
- Erzurum, Turkey
- Veliko Tarnovo, Bulgaria

== Notable natives ==
- Vagharsh Vagharshian, was an Armenian actor, director, playwright and public figure. People's Artist of the USSR (1954).
- Ibrahim Khalil Khan (1732–1806), Azerbaijani khan of the Karabakh Khanate.
- Gasim bey Zakir (1784–1857), Azerbaijani poet.
- Jafargulu agha Javanshir (1787–1867), Azerbaijani poet and major general of the Imperial Russian Army.
- Abbasqoli Mo'tamad-dawla Javanshir (1804–1862), Azerbaijani statesman and first minister of justice of Iran.
- Karbalayi Safikhan Karabakhi (1820–1879), Azerbaijani architect and one of the representatives of Karabakh architecture schools.
- Ivan Davidovich Lazarev (1820–1879), Armenian lieutenant-general of the Imperial Russian Army.
- Usta Gambar Karabakhi (1830–1905), Azerbaijani ornamentalist painter.
- Khurshidbanu Natavan (1832–1897), one of the best lyrical poets of Azerbaijan.
- Abdulla Beg Velizade (1841–1912), poet
- Sadigjan (1846–1902), Azerbaijani musician.
- Muratsan (1854–1908), Armenian writer and novelist.
- Karim bey Mehmandarov (1854–1929), Azerbaijani physician, founder of the Russian-Azerbaijani Shusha girls school.
- Amanullah Mirza Qajar (1857–1937), prince of Iran's Qajar dynasty. Major general in the Russian Empire and the Azerbaijan Democratic Republic, later military figure and politician in Iran.
- Mashhadi Mahammad Bulbul (1858–1918), Azerbaijani poet and singer
- Leo (1860–1932), Armenian historian.
- Stepan Aghajanian (1863–1940), Armenian painter.
- Hambardzum Arakelian (1865–1918), Armenian journalist and public activist.
- Alexander Atabekian (1868–1933), prominent Armenian anarchist.
- Ahmet Ağaoğlu (1869–1939), Azerbaijani politician and journalist.
- Abdurrahim bey Hagverdiyev (1870–1933), Azerbaijani playwright, stage director, politician and public figure.
- Feyzullah Mirza Qajar (1872–1920), prince of Iran's Qajar dynasty. Major general in the Russian Empire and the Azerbaijan Democratic Republic, later military figure and politician in Iran.
- Suleyman Sani Akhundov (1875–1939), Azerbaijani playwright and journalist.
- Vartan Sarkisov (1875–1955), Soviet-Armenian architect.
- Freidun Aghalyan (1876–1944), Armenian architect.
- Tuman Tumanian (1879–1906), Armenian liberation movement leader.
- Zulfugar Hajibeyov (1884–1950), Soviet-Azerbaijani composer.
- Ahmed Agdamski (1884–1954), Soviet-Azerbaijani opera singer.
- Arsen Terteryan (1882–1953), Soviet-Armenian scientist.
- Artashes Babalian (1886–1959), a politician of the First Republic of Armenia.
- Sahak Ter-Gabrielyan (1886–1937), Soviet-Armenian statesman.
- Hayk Gyulikekhvyan (1886–1951), Armenian literary critic.
- Ashot Hovhannisyan (1887–1972), Soviet-Armenian statesman and historian.
- Yusif Vazir Chamanzaminli (1887–1943), Soviet-Azerbaijani and writer.
- Nariman bey Narimanbeyov (1889–1937), Azerbaijani lawyer and statesman.
- Mikael Arutchian (1897–1961), Soviet-Armenian painter.
- Bulbul (1897–1961), Soviet-Azerbaijani opera tenor and folk music performer, father of Polad Bülbüloğlu, Azerbaijani singer, actor and diplomat.
- Ivan Tevosian (1902–1958), Soviet-Armenian statesman.
- Khan Shushinski (1901–1979), was an Azerbaijani khananda folk singer.
- Süreyya Ağaoğlu (1903–1989), Turkish Azerbaijani origin writer, jurist, and the first female lawyer in Turkish history.
- Ivan Knunyants (1906–1990), Soviet-Armenian chemist.
- Latif Karimov (1906–1991), Azerbaijani carpet designer known for his contributions to a variety of artistic fields, as well as for a number of books classifying and describing various designs of Azerbaijani rugs.
- Gevork Kotiantz (1909–1996), Soviet-Armenian painter.
- Armen Leonovich Takhtajan (1910–2009), Soviet-Armenian botanist
- Shamsi Badalbeyli (1911–1987), Soviet-Azerbaijani actor and theatre director.
- Nelson Stepanyan (1913–1944), Soviet-Armenian pilot and Lieutenant–Colonel of the Red Army.
- Barat Shakinskaya (1914–1999), Soviet-Azerbaijani actress.
- Gurgen Boryan (1915–1971), Soviet-Armenian poet and playwright.
- Soltan Hajibeyov (1919–1974), Soviet-Azerbaijani composer.
- Seyran Ohanyan (born 1962), Armenian politician and military commander.

== See also ==
- List of Azerbaijanis from Shusha
- List of Armenians from Shusha
- Shusha Flag Square
