= Shusha Flag Square =

- Şuşa Bayraq Meydanı
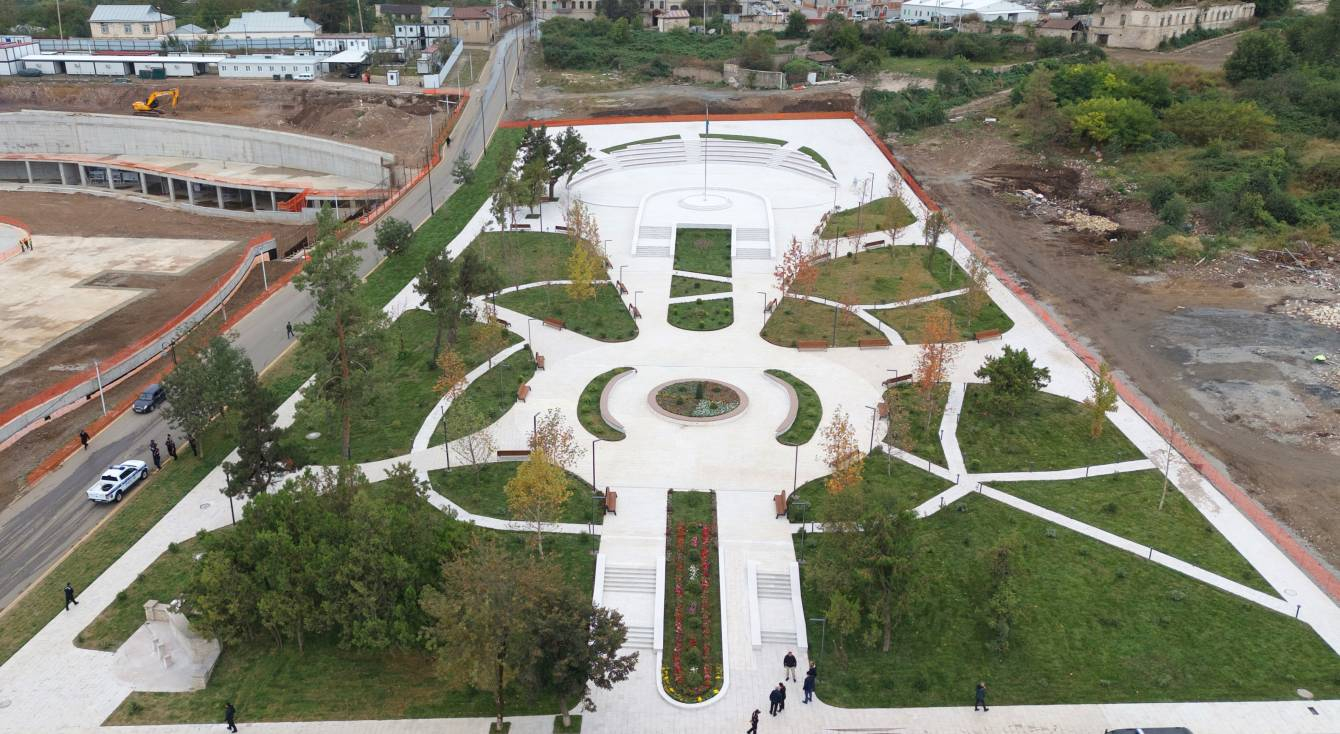
- Shusha Flag Square after reconstruction (September 2024)
- Interactive map of the Shusha Flag Square area

General information
- Location: Shusha, Azerbaijan
- Coordinates: 39°45′24″N 46°44′37″E
- Opened: 19 September 2024

Shusha Flag Square (Azerbaijani: Şuşa Bayraq Meydanı) is a public square located on Vagif Jafarov Street in the city of Shusha, Azerbaijan.

== History ==
On 15 January 2021, following the Second Karabakh War, President of Azerbaijan Ilham Aliyev raised the national flag of Azerbaijan in the central part of the city of Shusha.

Reconstruction works at Shusha Flag Square began in May 2024. The project was developed by the Baku State Design Institute on the basis of a conceptual design by the international architectural firm Chapman Taylor.

The official opening of the reconstructed square took place on 19 September 2024, attended by President Ilham Aliyev.

== Description ==
The square is surrounded by an amphitheater. The total area of the site is 9,190 square metres, including 3,693 square metres of landscaped greenery. The flagpole installed at the square is 11.7 metres high.

Most of the existing perennial plants were preserved and integrated into the redevelopment project. Landscaping was carried out using local plant species, including plane trees. Modern seating and a lighting system were installed.

According to the Shusha city master plan, the construction of a Victory Museum, a multifunctional concert and performance hall, and a shopping center is planned in the area surrounding the square.
