= Kanach Zham =

Armenian Apostolic church in Shusha, Azerbaijan

- Կանաչ Ժամ
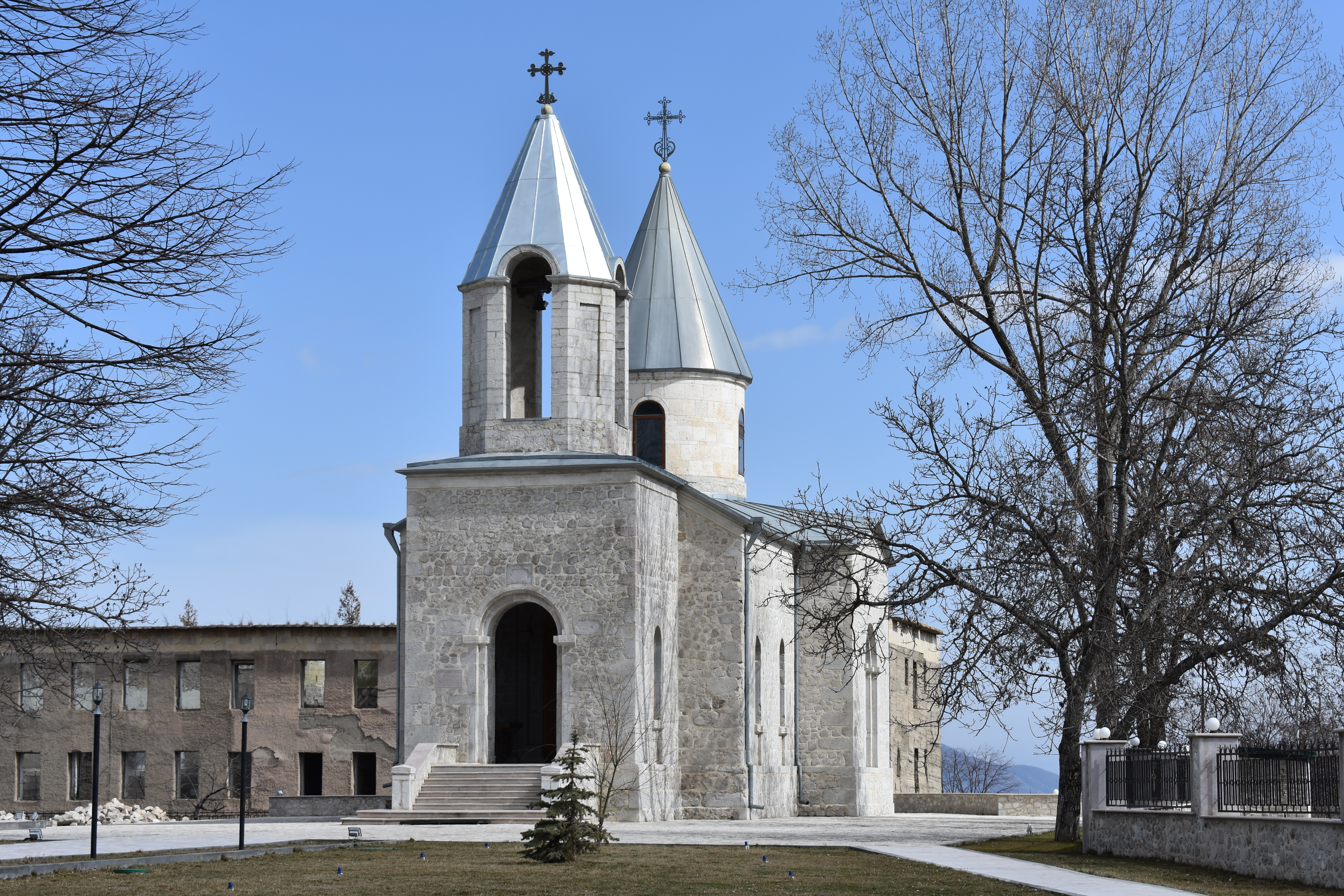
- The church in 2018, six years before its destruction in 2024.

- Location within Azerbaijan Location within Karabakh Economic Region

Religion
- Affiliation: Armenian Apostolic Church
- Status: Destroyed

Location
- Location: Shusha, Azerbaijan
- Coordinates: 39°45′45″N 46°44′37″E

Architecture
- Style: Armenian

Saint John the Baptist Church (Armenian: Սուրբ Հովհաննես Մկրտիչ եկեղեցի), commonly known as Kanach Zham (Armenian: Կանաչ Ժամ), was an Armenian Apostolic church in Shusha (known to Armenians as Shushi) in Azerbaijan, in the region of Nagorno-Karabakh, located just uphill from the Ghazanchetsots Cathedral. Kanach Zham means "Green Chapel" in Armenian, which refers to the previously green domes of the church. The church is sometimes also called Gharabakhtsots, the name of the old wooden church that was previously located in the same place as Kanach Zham, and which was named as such in honor of the farmers of Nagorno-Karabakh who built it.

The church was demolished by Azerbaijan between December 2023 and April 2024, although the Azerbaijani government and the Baku Eparchy of the Russian Orthodox Church had previously maintained that the church, which suffered damage during the war, was still standing and undergoing "renovation".

== History ==
The church was built in 1818 in the same place as the former Gharabakhtsots wooden church. The church is built according to a unique cruciform scheme, with the eastern facade of the church being adjacent to the western part of the chapel, and the tall dome of the church and its chapel can both be seen clearly from a distance across the town. The interior of the church also has some unique architectural features. Above the entrance to the church is an inscription from 1847 that says "Babayan Stepanos Hovhannes. In the memory of his deceased brother Mkrtych."

== Damage ==
Around November 2020, both Armenian and foreign sources stated that the towers of the church had been destroyed by Azerbaijan after the capture of the town in the 2020 Nagorno-Karabakh war, referring to pictures and a video circulating online of the partially destroyed church. The Mother See of Holy Etchmiadzin of the Armenian Apostolic Church condemned the damage in a statement in November.

Satellite images taken on February 15, 2021, showed the church had suffered significant damage in the time since it had come under Azerbaijani rule. This received coverage in Armenian and international press outlets, including in Le Monde. The destruction of the church can be seen on Google Maps in April 2021. An Azerbaijani news agency denied Kanach Zham's destruction, while also denying the church's Armenian heritage (Azerbaijani sources ascribe a Russian provenance to the church, claiming that it was modified according to an "Armenianized" style in the 1840s.). It stated that the church, which had been severely damaged during the war, was undergoing renovation and its dome was being rebuilt. The Russian Orthodox Church Eparchy of Baku also claims that the church is to be renovated. Video footage from a BBC Russian reporter who visited Shusha in September 2021 showed that the church was undergoing ostensible renovation.

On April 18, 2024, Caucasus Heritage Watch, a watchdog group made up of researchers from Purdue and Cornell, reported using satellite imagery that the church had been fully destroyed.

== Gallery ==
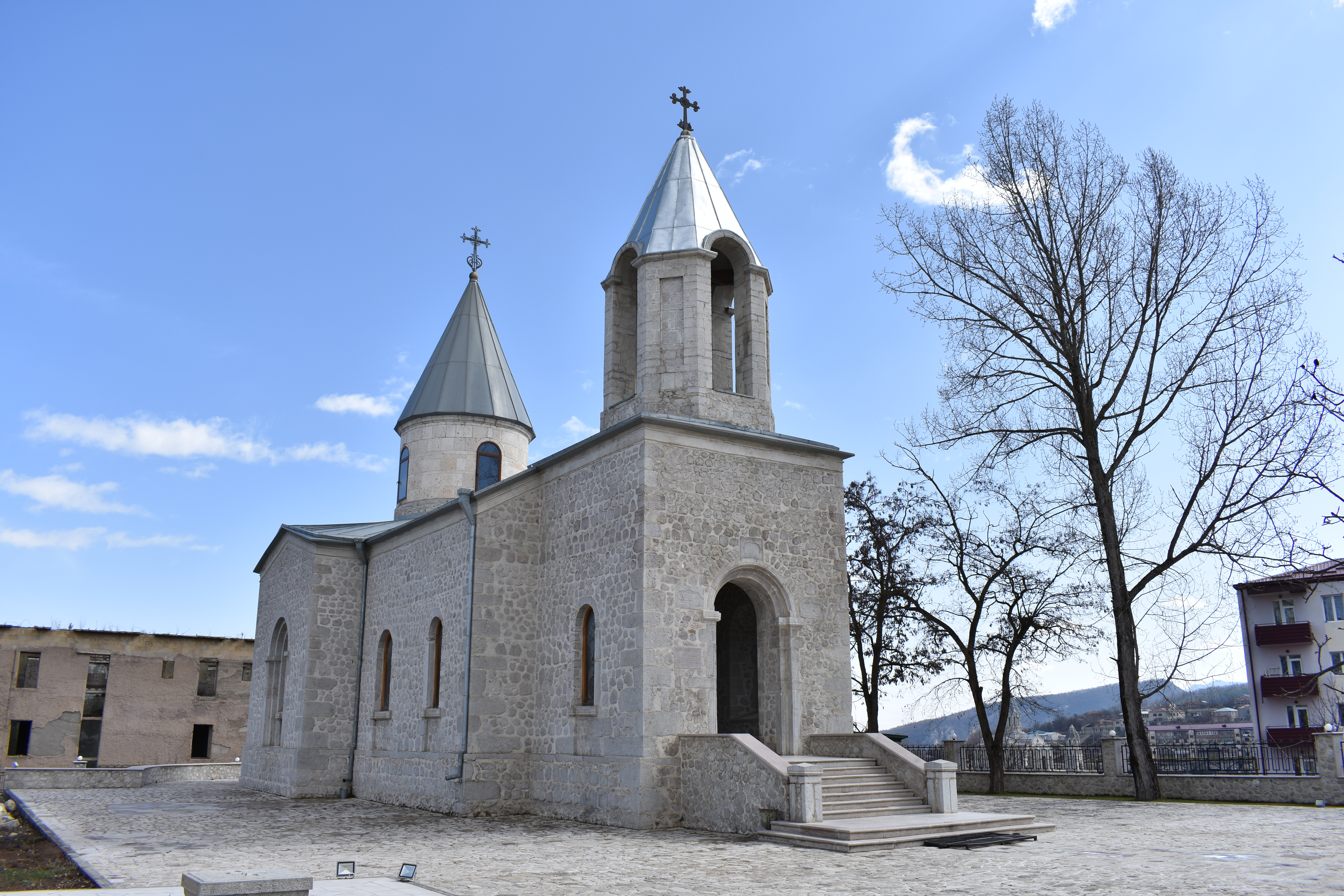
Exterior pre-2020 war

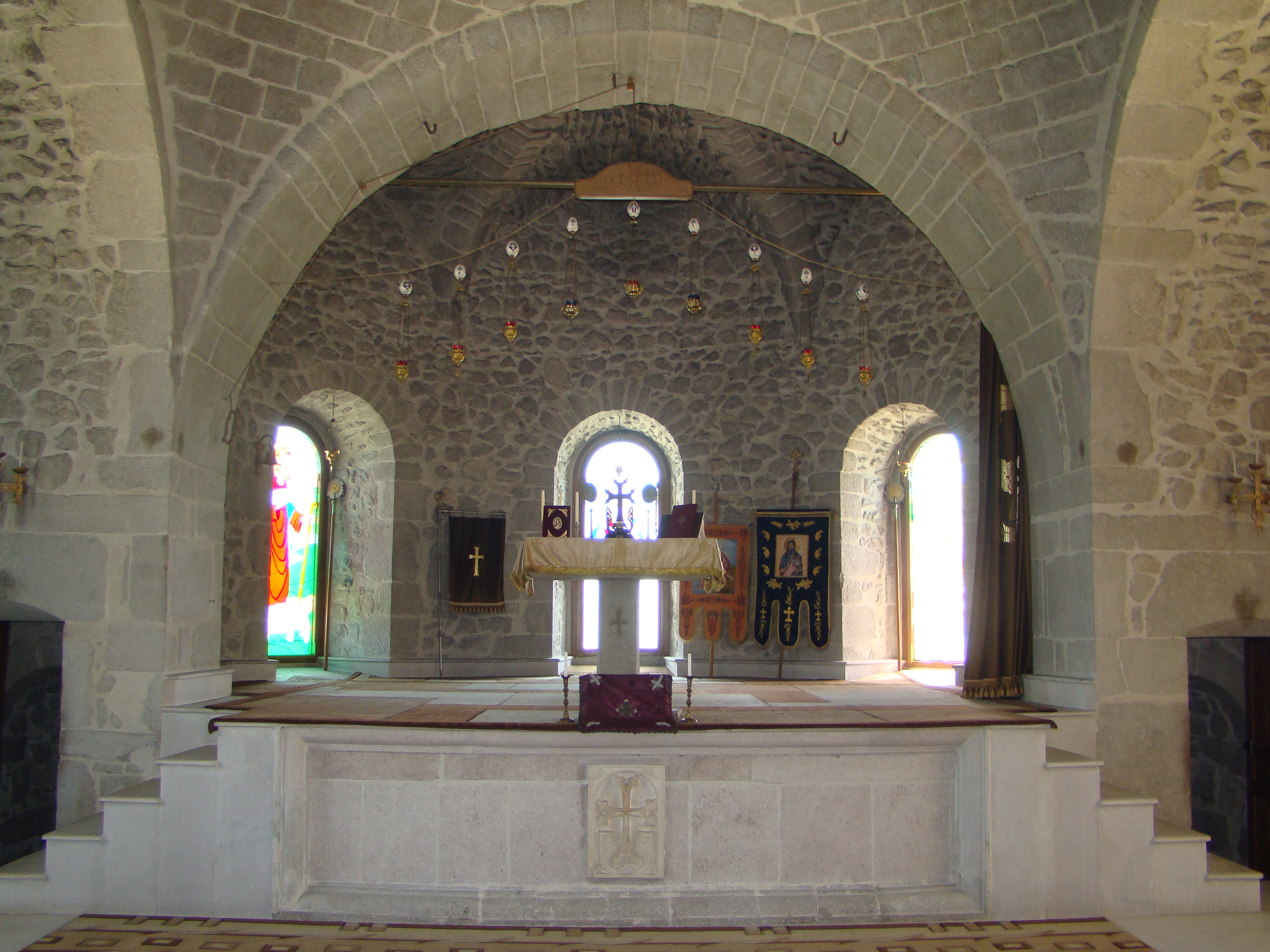
Interior pre-2020 war

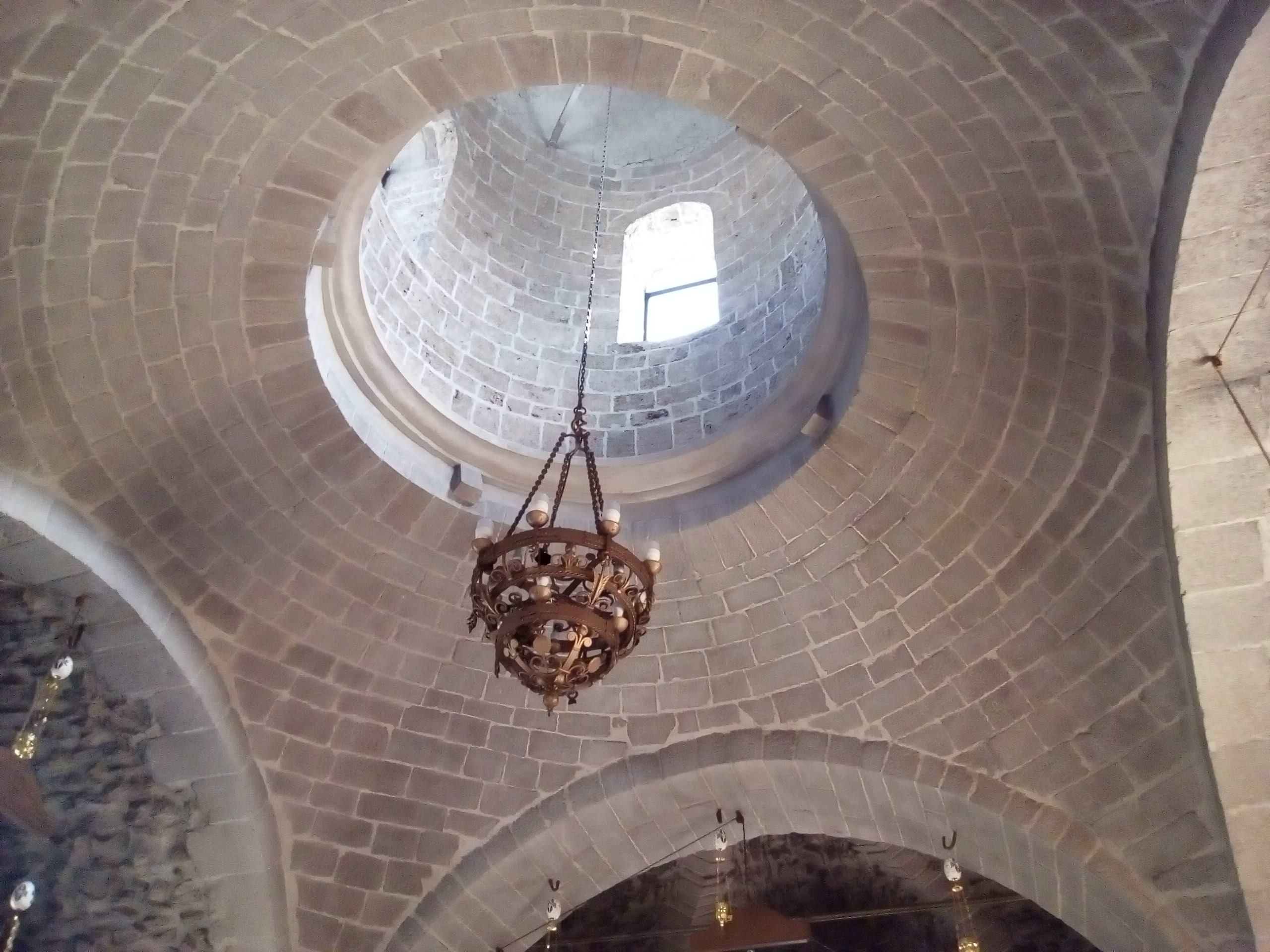
Ceiling & dome pre-2020 war

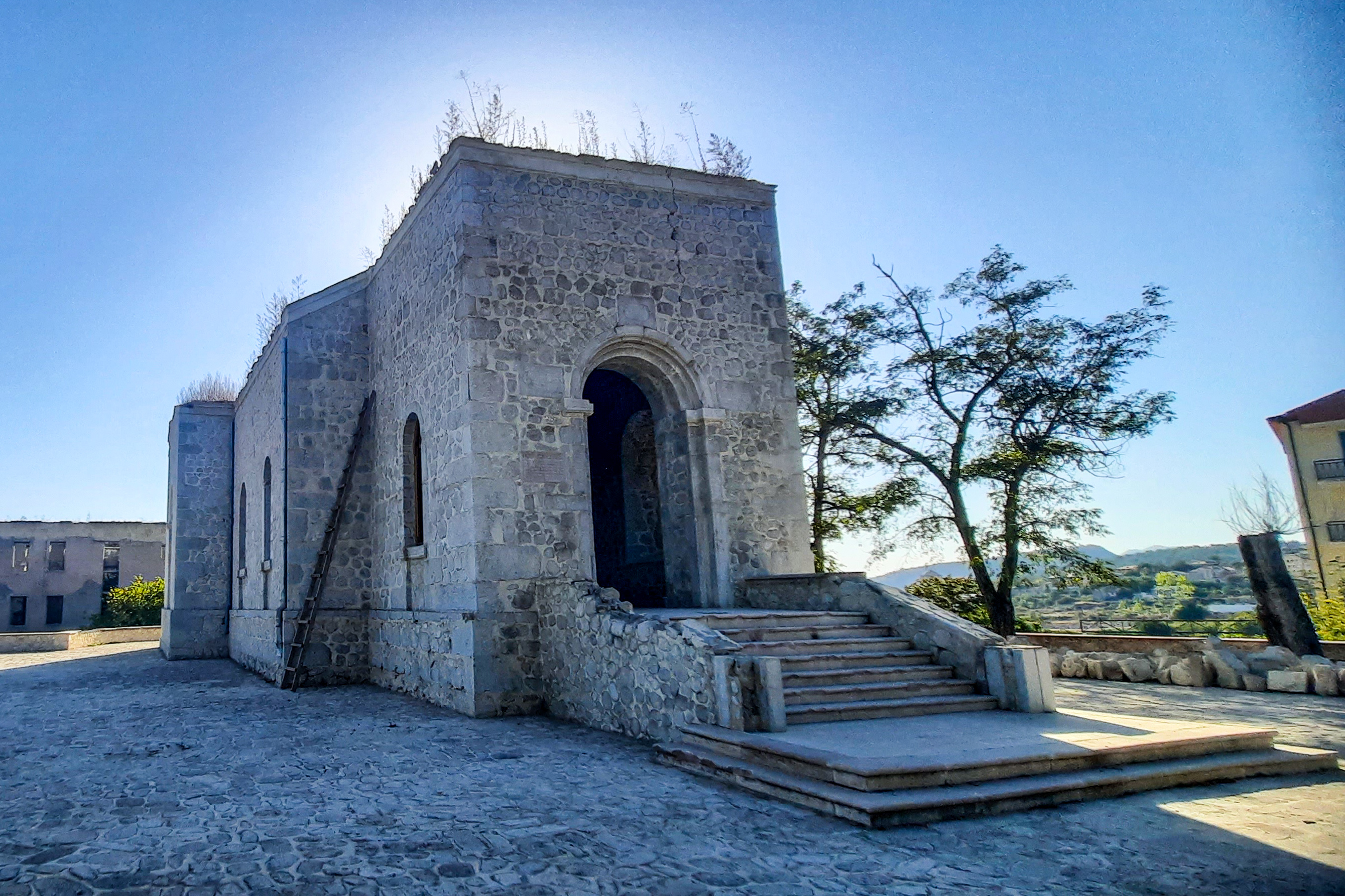
Exterior in September 2022

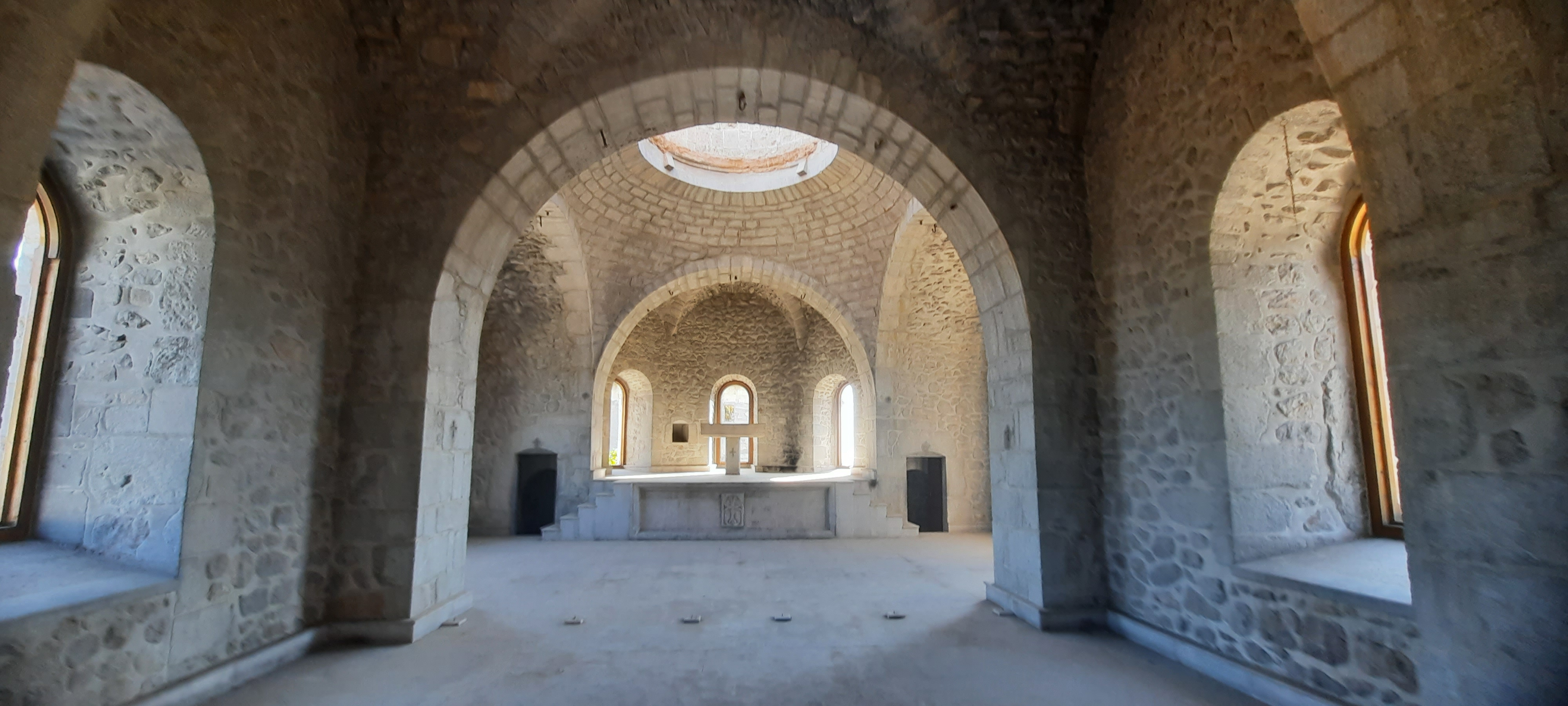
Interior in September 2022
