= Mirza Ismail Javanshir =

- Born: 1828; Shusha, Georgia Governorate, Russian Empire
- Died: 1894 (aged 65–66); Shusha, Shusha uezd, Elizavetpol Governorate, Russian Empire
- Resting place: Shusha
- Occupation: Poet
- Language: Azerbaijani

Mirza Ismail Mashadi Gasim oglu Hajili-Javanshir (Azerbaijani: Mirzə İsmayil Məşədi Qasım oğlu Hacılı-Cavanşir; 1828 — 1894) was an Azerbaijani poet and calligrapher of the 19th century, a member of the literary society "Majlisi-Faramushan".

== Life ==
Mirza Ismail Javanshir was born in 1828 in Shusha. In his youth, he was engaged in the saddle trade with his father, and after that he worked as a perfumer. He was educated in a madrasa and a modern school, and because he was known as an intellectual in Shusha, he received the nickname Mirza. From a young age, he wrote poems under the pseudonym "Makhzun". Mir Mohsun Navvab, Mahammad Agha Mujtahidzade and Firudin bey Kocharli wrote about him in their works. He was a member of "Majlisi-Faramushan", a literary assembly in Shusha. Mirza Ismail died in 1894 in Shusha.

== Sources ==
- Köçərli, Firudin (2005), "Azərbaycan ədəbiyyatı", II cild (PDF), Baku: Avrasiya press
- Nəvvab, Mir Möhsün (1995), Təzkireyi-Nəvvab (PDF), Baku: Azərnəşr
- Çingizoğlu, Ənvər (2011), Məhəmmədbağır bəy Cavanşirin törəmələri (Bağırbəyovlar), Baku: Soy, №6
