= Mikael Arutchian =

Mikael Aveti Arutchian (Russian: Арутчян Михаил Аветович; July 18 [O.S. July 6], 1897 – June 9, 1961), was a Soviet and Armenian theatrical painter and designer, People's artist of Armenia (1958). He is one of the founders of Armenian theatral-decorative art.

Arutchian was born in Shusha. He graduated in Saratov (1920–23) and Paris (1924–25). He designed more than a hundred theatrical productions including "Revolt" (1928), "In circle" (1930), "Figaro's marriage" (1933), "Othello" (1940) - at Sundukyan theatre of Yerevan (he was the chief painter from 1928 to 1939); "Pikovaya dama" (1956) - at Yerevan theatre of opera and ballet (he was the chief designer in 1939–49).

Furthermore, he also worked as a book illustrator and wallpaper designer. He died in Moscow.
