= Arsen Terteryan =

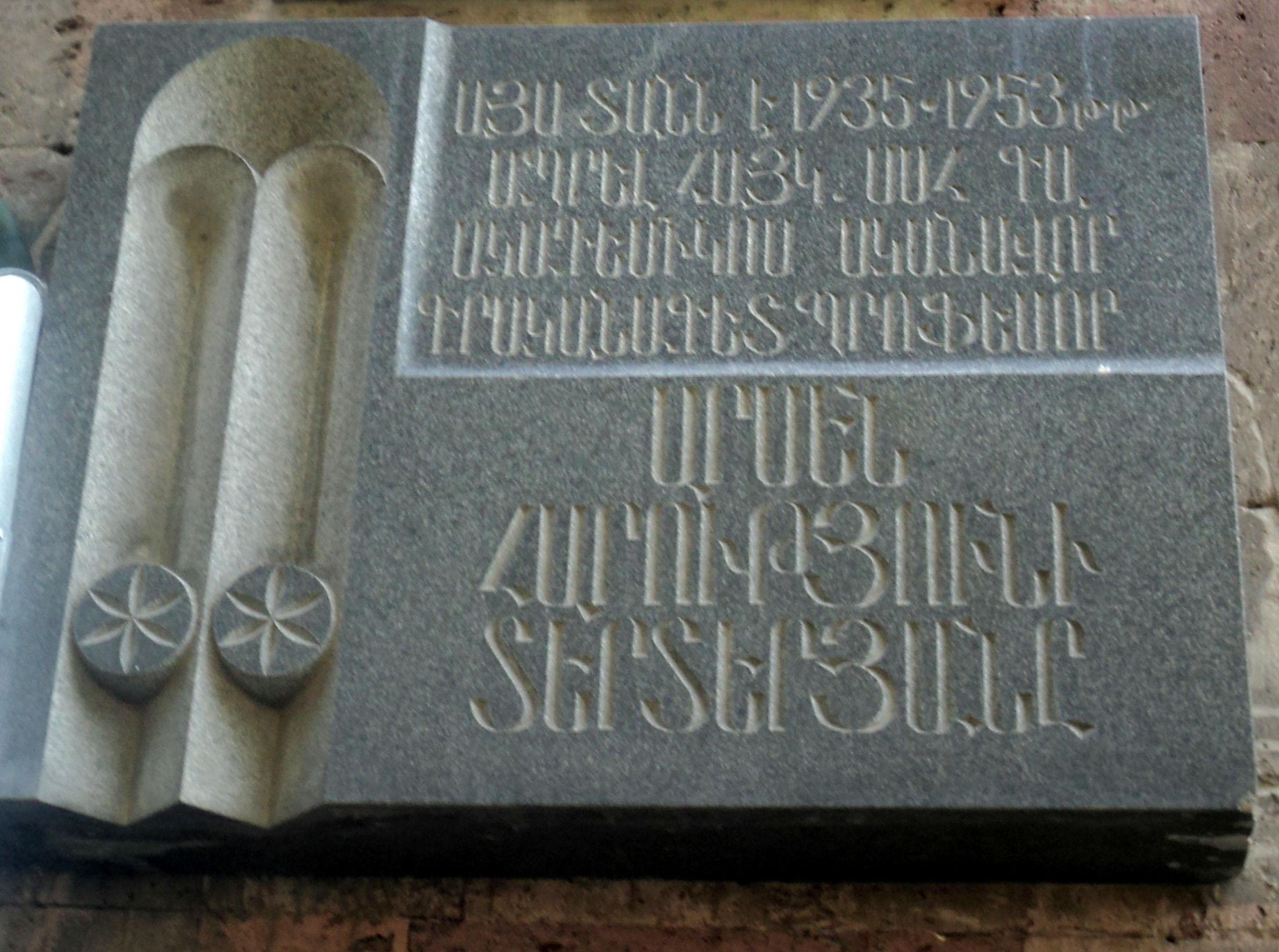
Arsen Terteryan's Plaque in Yerevan

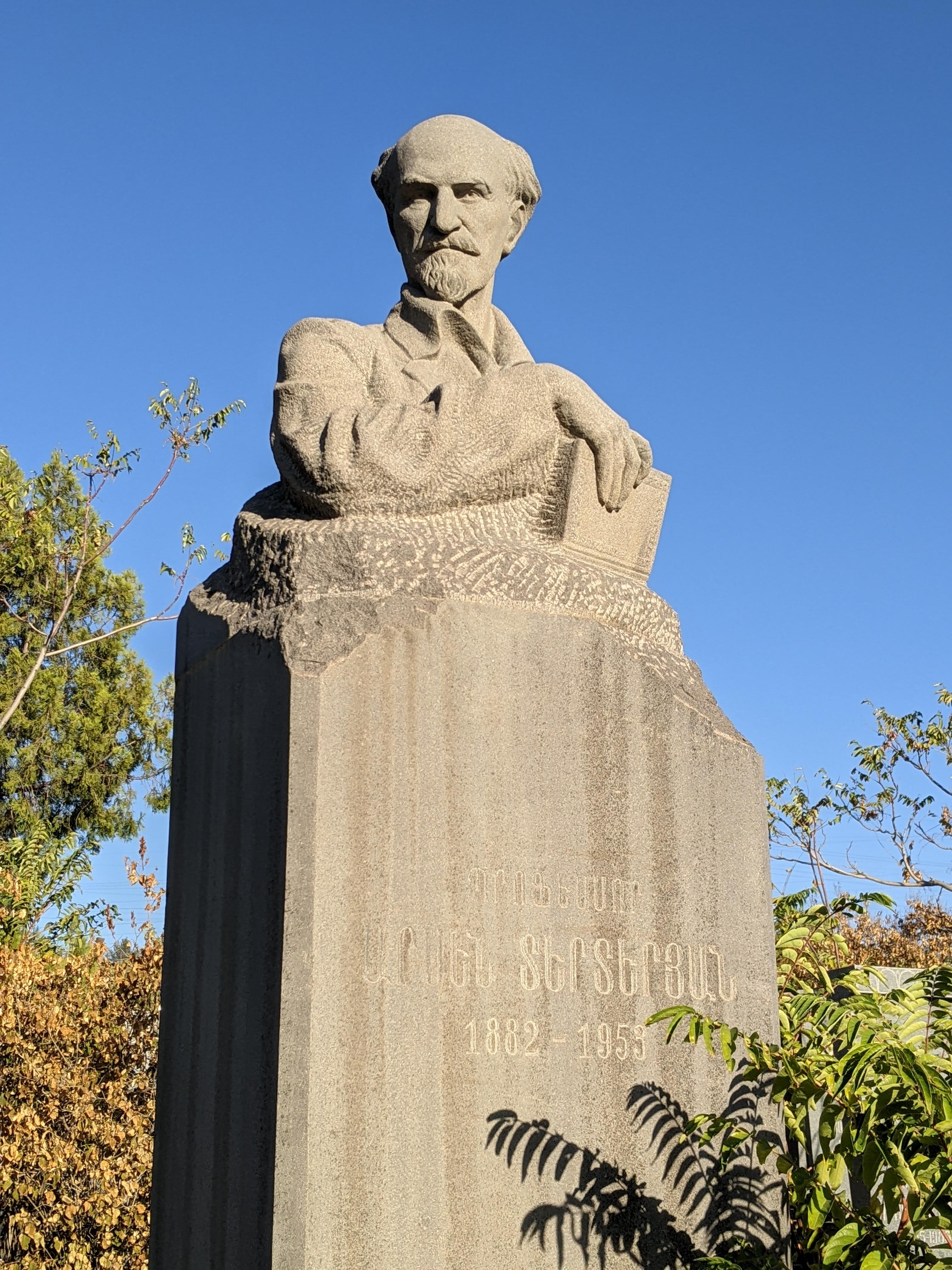
Arsen Terteryan's Grave at Tokhmakh Cemetery, Yerevan

Arsen Harutyuni Terteryan (Armenian: Արսեն Տերտերյան; 22 December 1882, Shusha – 6 October 1953, Yerevan) was a Soviet Armenian literary critic, academic of Science Academy of Armenia, awarded by Renowned scientist title (1940).

Graduated from the Saint-Petersburg psycho-neurological institute in 1909. Since 1930 a Professor of Yerevan State University. He is an author of critical researches dedicated to Mikael Nalbandian, Nar-Dos, Khachatur Abovian, Valeri Bryusov and Alexander Shirvanzade.
