= Haji Yusifli Mosque =

Former mosque in Shusha, Karabakh, Azerbaijan

- Azerbaijani: Hacı Yusifli məscidi
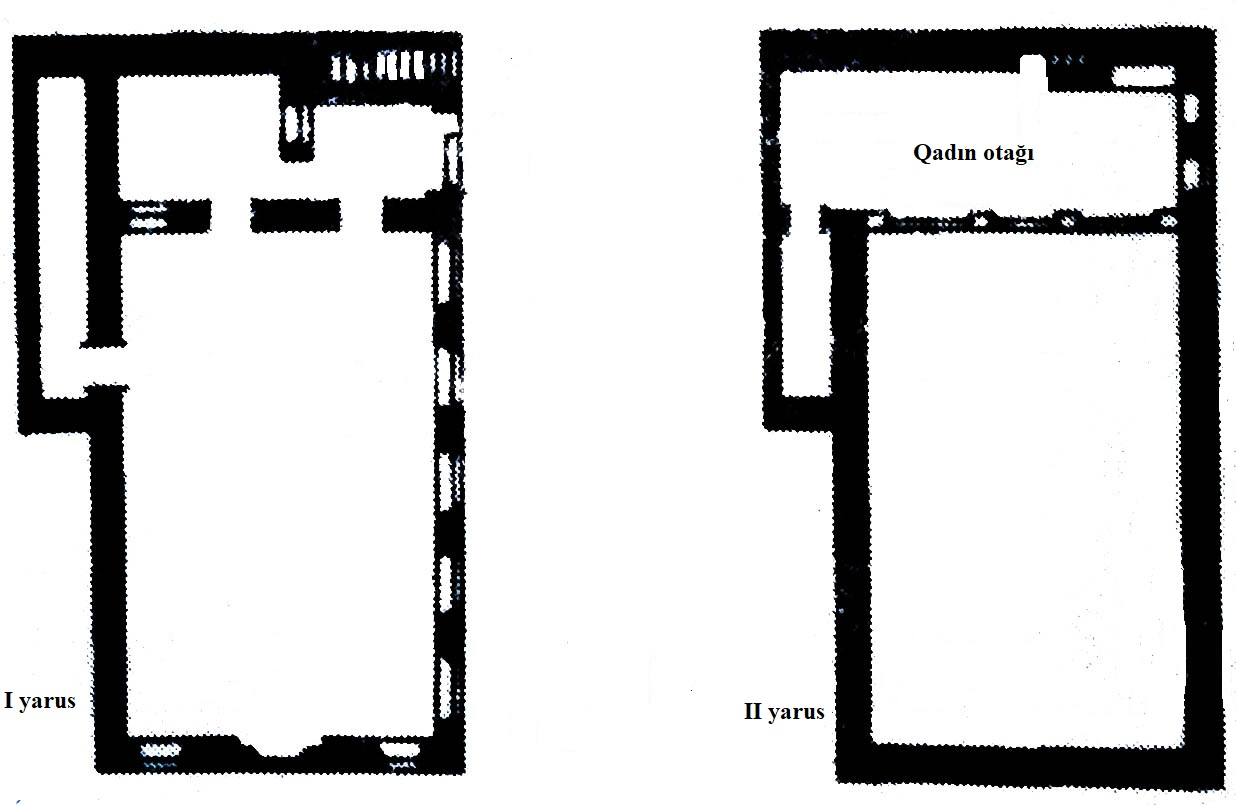
- Floor plan of the former mosque

- Location of the former mosque in Azerbaijan

Religion
- Affiliation: Shia Islam (former)
- Ecclesiastical or organizational status: Mosque (former)
- Status: Abandoned

Location
- Location: Shusha, Karabakh
- Country: Azerbaijan
- Interactive map of Haji Yusifli Mosque
- Coordinates: 39°45′44″N 46°45′19″E

Architecture
- Type: Mosque architecture
- Style: Islamic
- Completed: 18th century

The Haji Yusifli Mosque (Azerbaijani: Hacı Yusifli məscidi; sometimes also transliterated as Hajy Yusifli Mosque) is a former Shia Islam mosque located in Shusha, in the Karabakh region of Azerbaijan, approximately 350 km (220 mi) southwest from Baku, the capital of Azerbaijan.

== Overview ==
The former mosque is located on intersection of G. Zakir and G.Ismayilov streets of the Haji Yusifli neighborhood of Shusha. Haji Yusifli neighbourhood is one of nine lower and earlier neighbourhoods of Shusha in the northern part of the city. Julfalar Mosque was one of the 17 mosques functioning in Shusha by the end of the 19th century.

The exterior design of Julfalar Mosque followed a rectangular plan neighborhood mosque building like the Chukhur Mahalla Mosque and the Julfalar Mosque, but the interior completely complied with Islamic religious architecture. There was a Haji Yusifli spring by the mosque supplying mineral water for public use. The Haji Yusifli mosque went through a complete renovation along with Yukhari Govhar Agha, Ashaghi Govhar Agha, Taza Mahalla, Mamayi, Saatli, Kocharli mosques, Caravanserai of Agha Gahraman Mirsiyab, residences of Mehmandarovs, Zohrabbayovs, Khurshidbanu Natavan and the “Shirin su” bath house before occupation.

The mosque was among the most valuable monuments of the Shusha State Historical and Architectural Reserve.

== See also ==
- Shia Islam in Azerbaijan
- List of mosques in Azerbaijan
