= Julfalar Mosque =

Former mosque in Shusha, Azerbaijan

- Azerbaijani: Culfalar məscidi
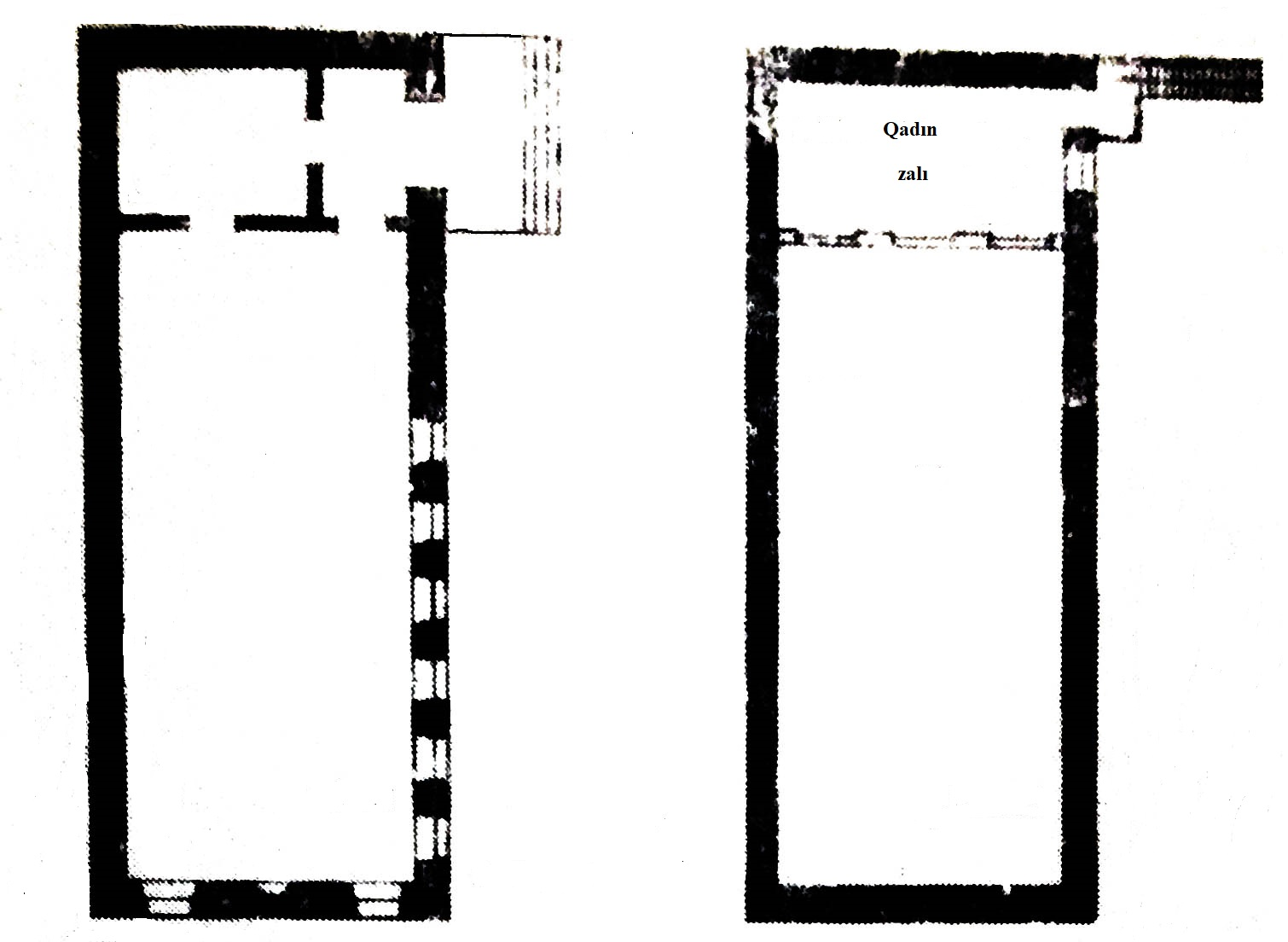
- Floor plan of the former mosque

- Location of the former mosque in Azerbaijan

Religion
- Affiliation: Shia Islam (former)
- Ecclesiastical or organizational status: Mosque
- Status: Inactive

Location
- Location: Uzeyir Hajibeyov, Shusha, Karabakh
- Country: Azerbaijan
- Interactive map of Julfalar Mosque
- Coordinates: 39°45′30.4″N 46°45′15.5″E

Architecture
- Type: Mosque architecture
- Style: Islamic architecture
- Completed: 19th century

The Julfalar Mosque (Azerbaijani: Culfalar məscidi) is a former Shia Islam mosque, located in Shusha, in the Karabakh region of Azerbaijan, approximately 350 km (220 mi) southwest from Baku, the Azerbaijani capital.

== Overview ==
The mosque is located on intersection of Uzeyir Hajibeyov and S. Asgarov streets of Julfalar neighborhood of Shusha. The Julfalar neighbourhood is one of nine lower and earlier neighbourhoods of Shusha.

The Julfalar Mosque was one of the seventeen mosques functioning in Shusha by the end of the 19th century. It was regarded one of the most valuable monuments of Shusha along with Yukhari Govhar Agha Mosque and Ashaghi Govhar Agha Mosque. There were no minarets. The exterior design of Julfalar Mosque followed a rectangular plan neighborhood mosque building like Chukhur Mahalla and Haji Yusifli mosques but the interior completely complied with Islamic religious architecture.

== See also ==
- Shia Islam in Azerbaijan
- List of mosques in Azerbaijan
