= Caravanserai of Agha Gahraman Mirsiyab =

Historical building in Shusha, Azerbaijan

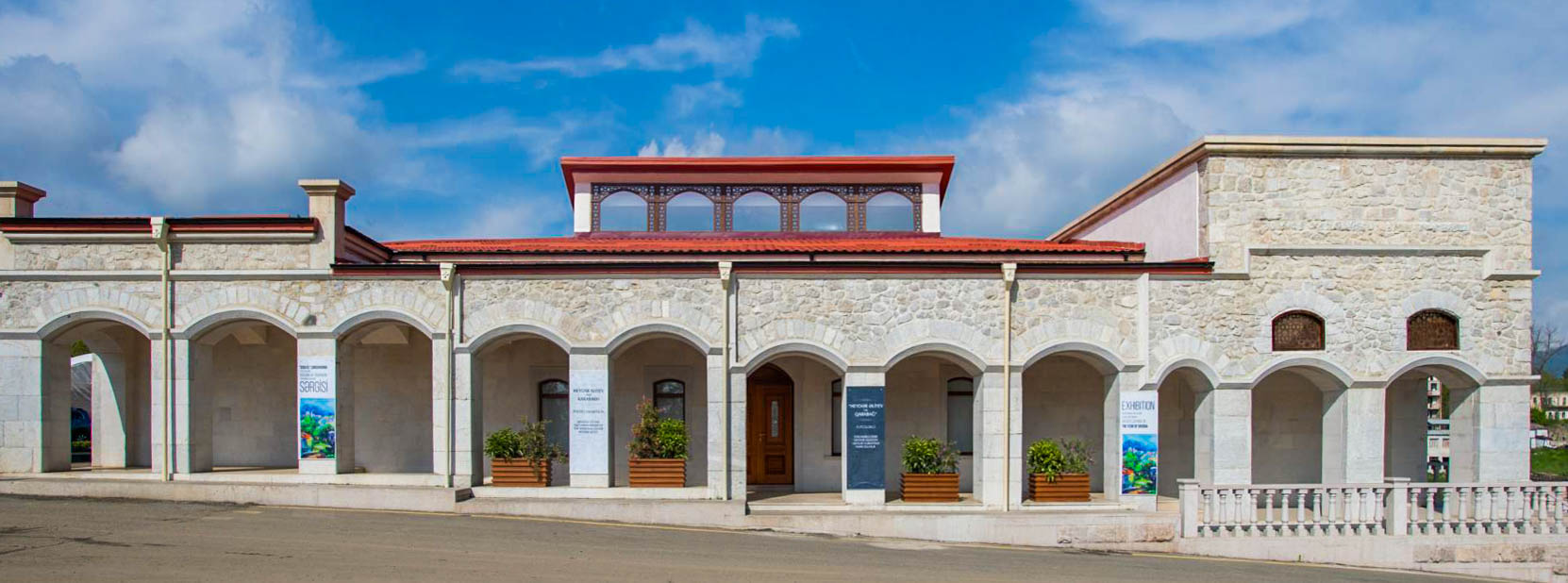
- Caravanserai building after restoration works in 2023

Location
- Location: Shusha, Azerbaijan
- Interactive map of Caravanserai of Agha Gahraman Mirsiyab

Architecture
- Type: Caravanserai
- Style: Architectural school of Arran
- Established: 18th century

Caravanserai of Agha Gahraman Mirsiyab Oghlu (Azerbaijani: Ağa Qəhrəman Mirsiyab oğlunun karvansarası, Armenian: Մասջիդլի քարավանատուն, Persian: کاروانسرای مسجدی) also known as the Masjidli Caravanserai, is located at 31 M.F. Akhundov Street in the city of Shusha. The caravanserai has been registered as an important historical and cultural monument of the country by the Ministry of Culture and Tourism of the Republic of Azerbaijan.

The caravanserai was built in the 1880s with funds from the famous Shusha merchant Agha Gahraman Mirsiyab Oghlu. The main facade of the caravanserai, located near the edge of the steep rock, opens onto Rasta Bazaar Street, the central commercial street of Shusha. The second floor of the building had 25 rooms intended for merchants, while the first floor had commercial offices and nearly 30 shops. During the Soviet era, the caravanserai was used as a collective farm market.

== History ==
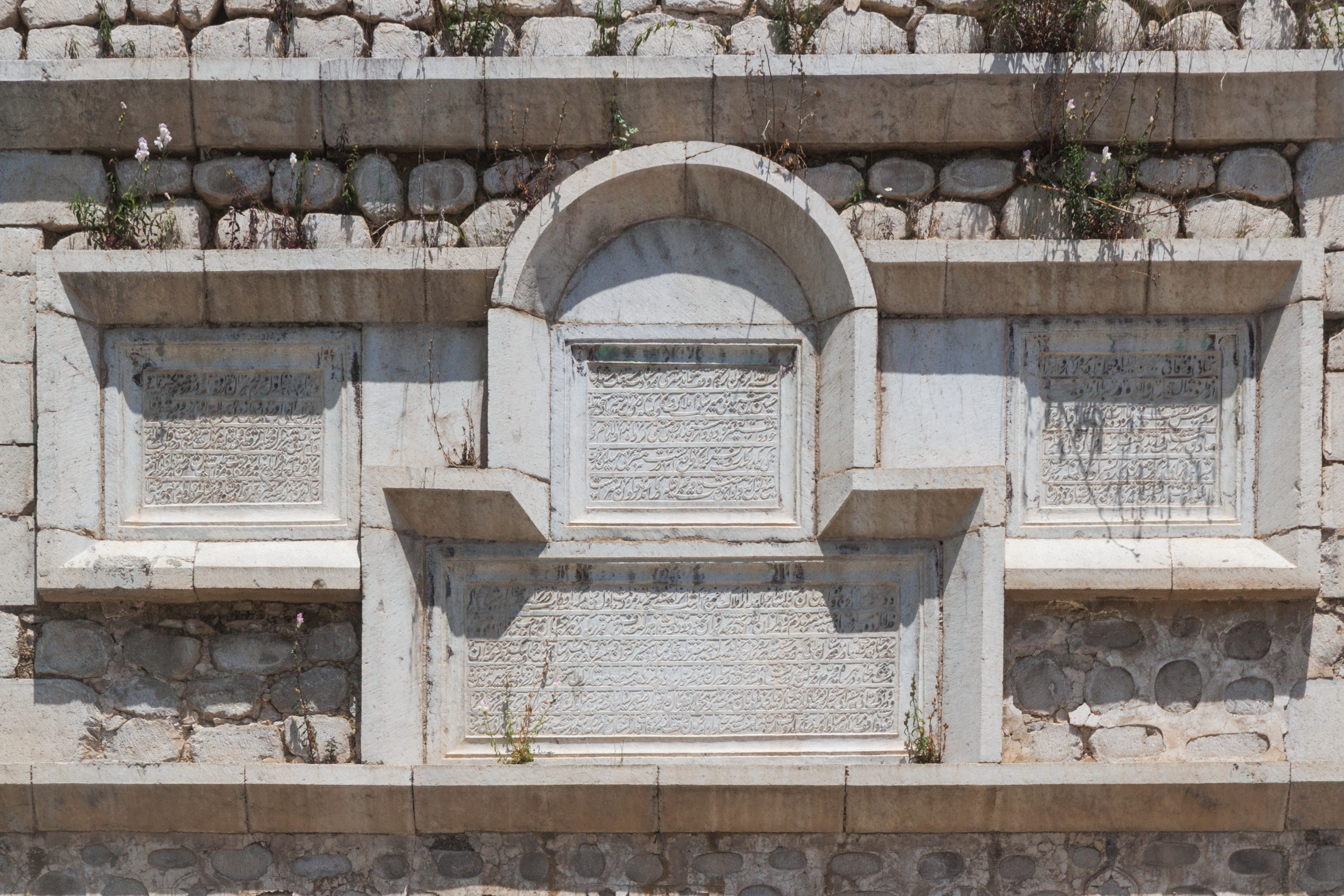
Construction inscription on the facade of the building

Caravanserai was built in the 19th century in the city of Shusha for the wealthy merchant Agha Garib Mirsiyab Oghlu's funds. According to Firudin Shushinski in his work dedicated to the history and cultural monuments of Shusha:

in the late 19th century, there were ten caravanserais operating in the city. Among them were the caravanserais of Haji Abbas, Qatirchi Murad, Mirsiyab's caravanserai, including Satan Bazaar and Khanlig Mukhtar caravanserais. However, the best caravanserai in the city was Mirsiyab Oghlu Meshedi Shukur's caravanserai. This magnificent building was built in the 1880s, and its architectural ensemble immediately catches the eye.

Mirsiyab Oghlu's caravanserai, located in the western part of the city square, was also known as a mosque caravanserai. Several trade offices and about thirty large and small shops were located in the caravanserai. In addition to these, there were also a barber, a shoemaker, a tailor, a hat maker, and other workshops operating in the caravanserai. Mirsiyab Oghlu's caravanserai received goods from all parts of Karabakh, including other Caucasian countries, Iran, and Russia.

The monument was under the occupation of the Armed Forces of Armenia from May 8, 1992, until November 8, 2020. In the framework of the Second Karabakh War, the city of Shusha was conquered by the Azerbaijani army on November 8, 2020.

== Architectural features ==
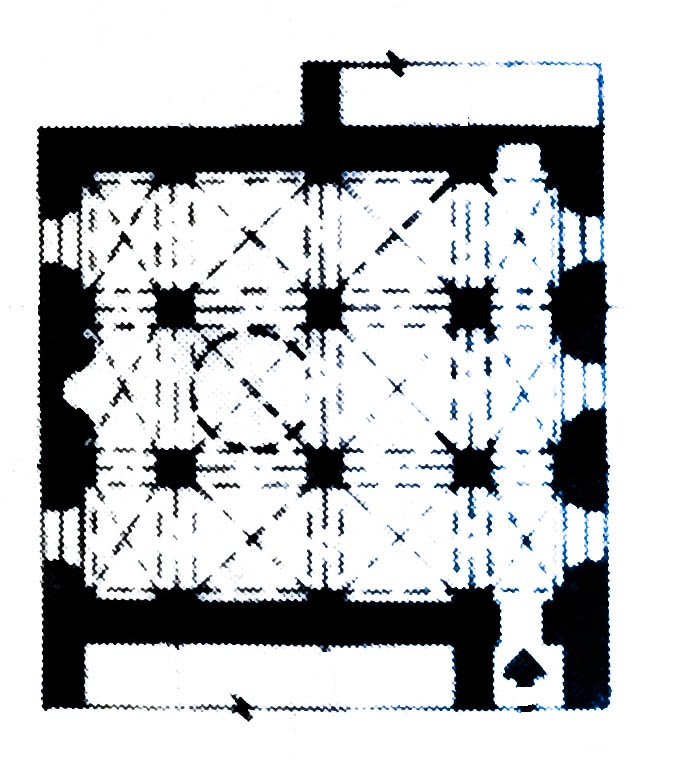
Plan of the caravanserai

The main façade of the caravanserai located near the steep rock opens to Rasta Bazaar Street, which is the central commercial street of Shusha. Karabakh historian Baharli, who writes about the caravanserai in his chronicle "Karabakh Chronicles," shows that the building reflects the main features of Shusha's architecture.

Agha Gahraman Mirsiyab Oghlu's caravanserai is a two-story large building distinguished by its unique architecture and planning. There were 25 rooms intended for merchants on the second floor of the building, and trade offices and nearly 30 shops on the first floor.

=== Mosque ===
On the second floor of the building, a mosque was also built for the traders and guests, located on the corner of the building. The three-nave prayer hall of the mosque was covered with an arched roof resting on eight octagonal columns, which is characteristic of Shusha architecture. The prayer hall measures 8.36x9.22 meters.

The walls of the mosque were decorated with delicate reliefs. The seven-arched niche of the mihrab was also adorned with fine reliefs. According to E. Avalov, the location of the mosque inside the caravanserai is a unique feature, although it is a common practice in similar buildings, it is not analogous to any other in Islamic architecture.

== Gallery ==
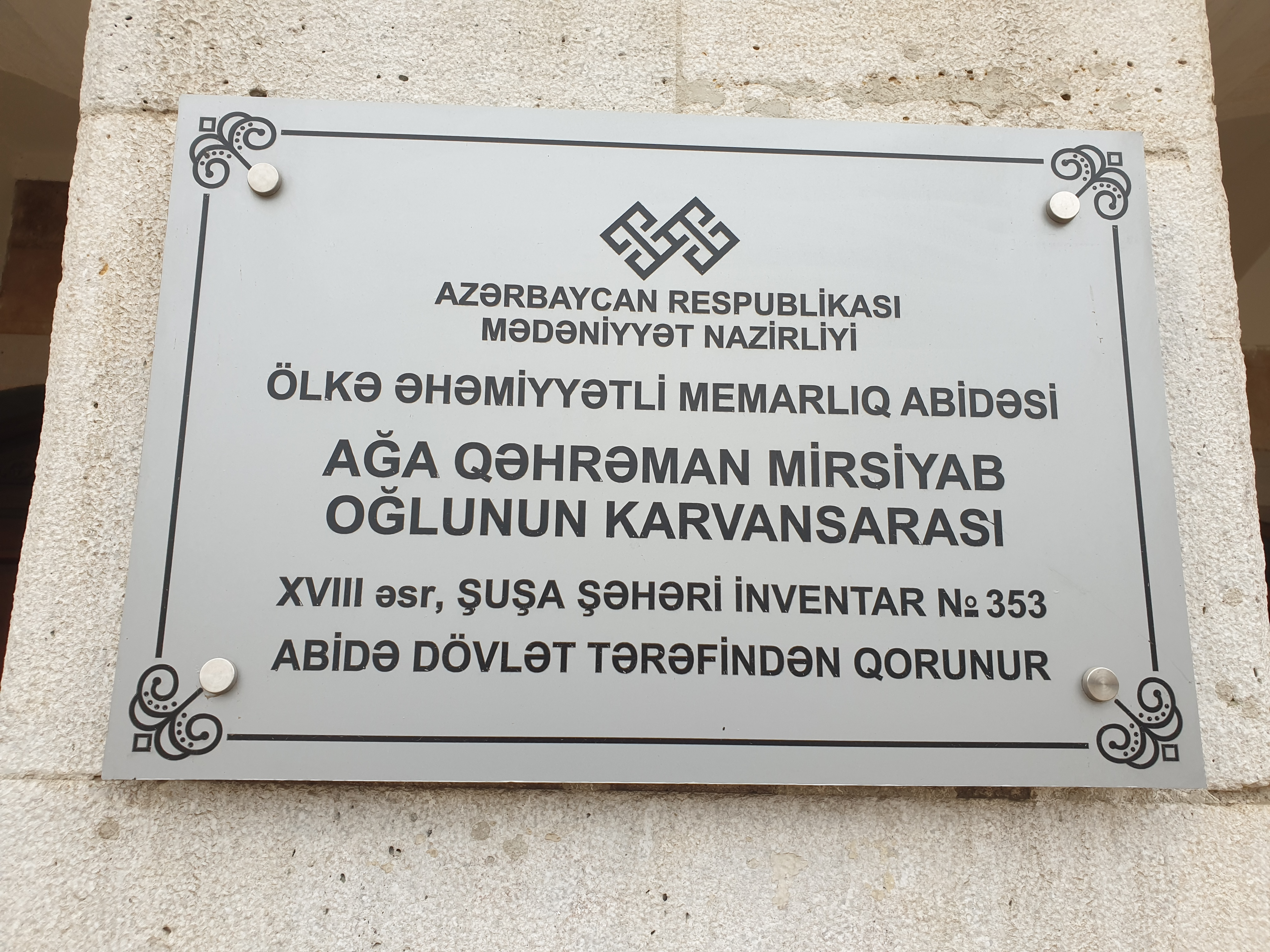

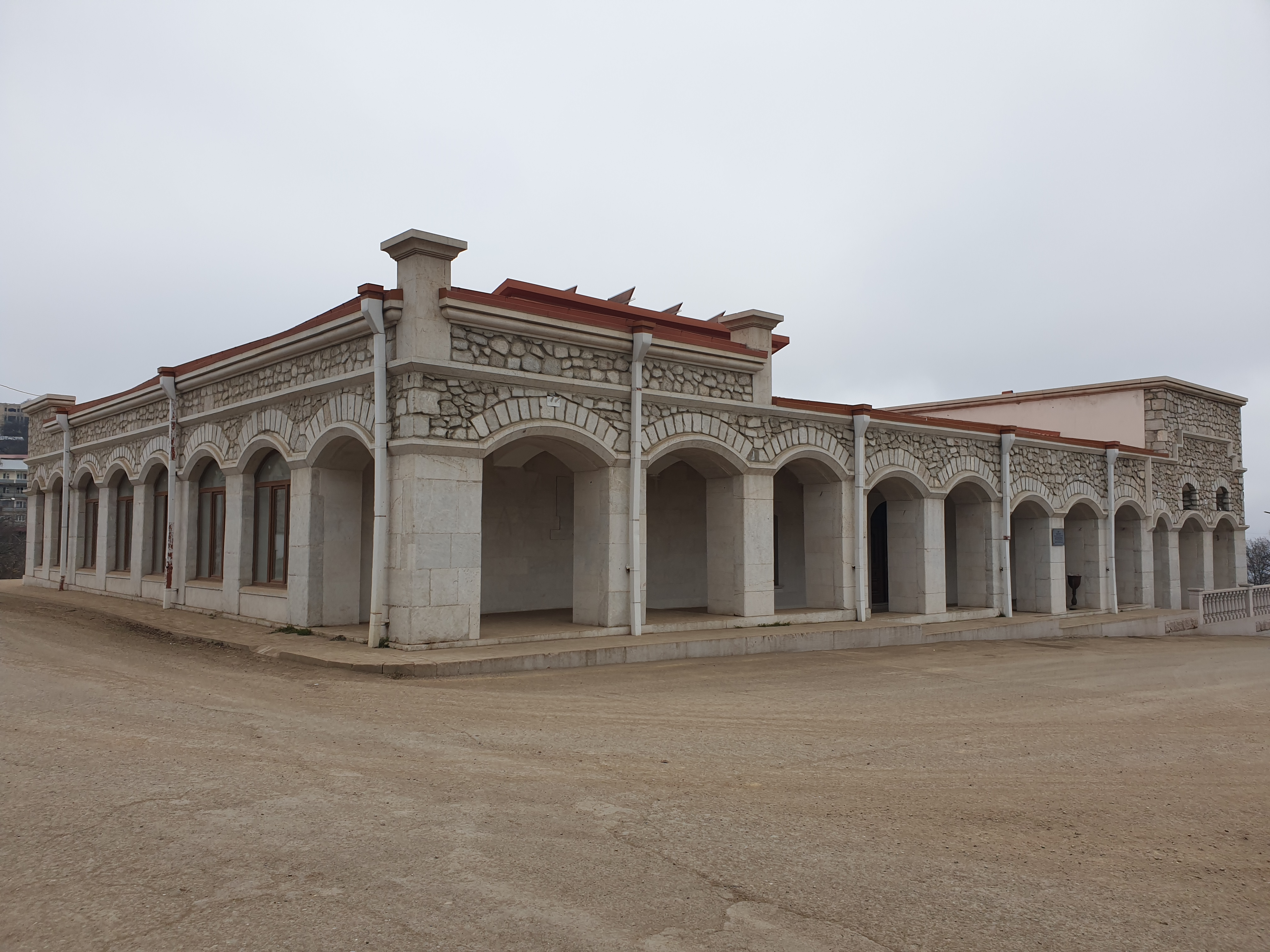

== See also ==
- Khanlig Mukhtar caravanserai

== Sources ==
- Авалов, Э. В. (1977). Архитектура города Шуши и проблемы сохранения его исторического облика. Баку: Элм.
- Фатуллаев, Ш. С. (1970). Памятники Шуши. Баку.
- Гулиев, Гасан (2013). Смерть дипломата, или к истокам конфликта в Карабахе. Bakı.
