= Shah Abbas Square =

- Şah Abbas meydanı (Azerbaijani); میدان شاه‌عباس (Persian)
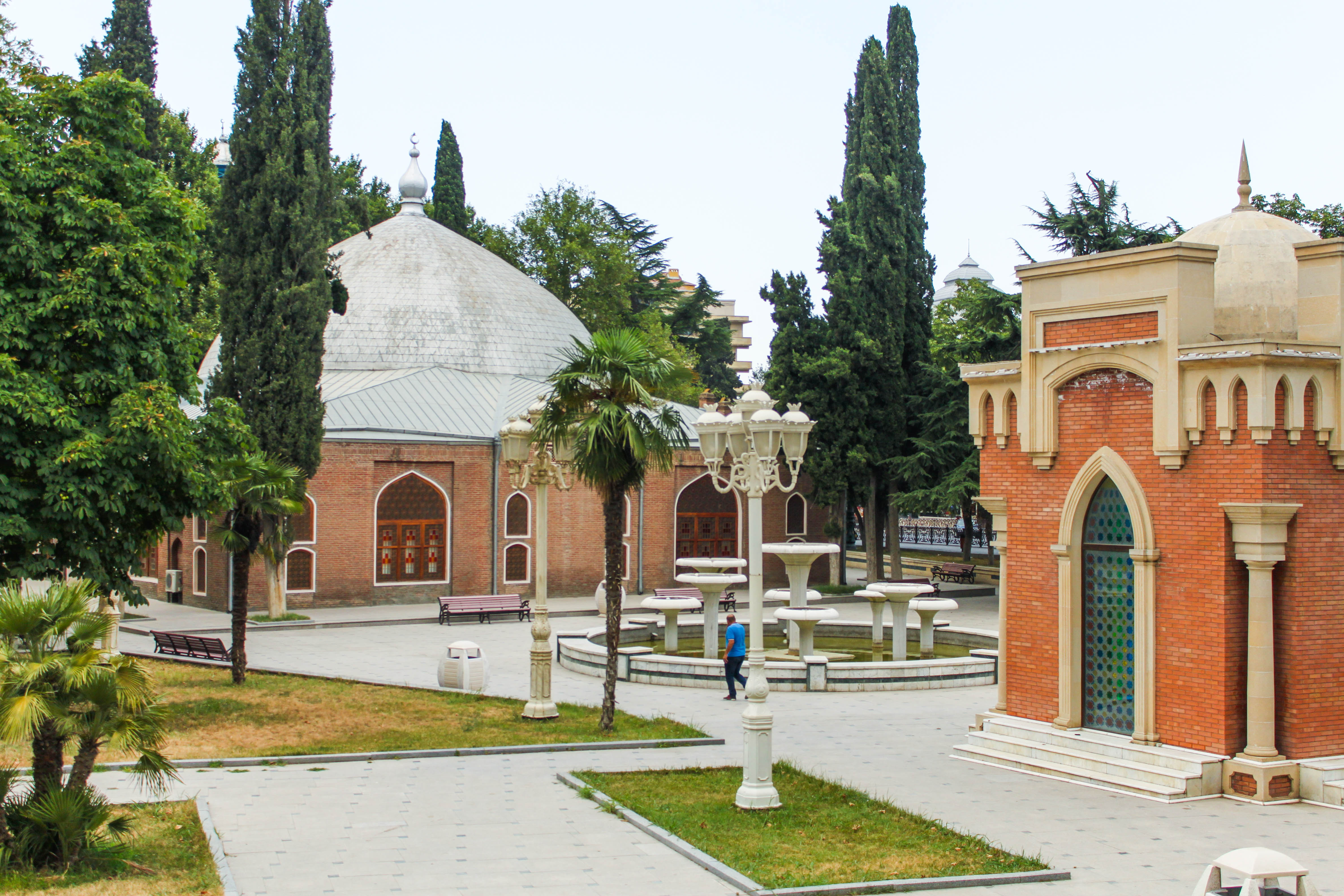
- Interactive map of Shah Abbas Square
- 40°40′41″N 46°21′32″E
- Type: Square
- Location: Ganja, Azerbaijan

History
- Founded: 17th century

Site notes
- Architect: Baha' al-din al-'Amili

Shah Abbas Square is a square located in the historical center of the city of Ganja, Azerbaijan. At one time, it was the main memorial complex of the suburb of the Ganja fortress. The complex of Shah Abbas Square was firstly mentioned in the plan of the Ganja fortress of 1797. This architectural ensemble, located in the center of the suburb, consisted of a mosque, a bathhouse and other buildings.

The area, elongated in the northeast and southwest directions with dimensions of 65x320 meters, has an irregular rectangular shape. The Shah Abbas Mosque is located in the narrow southeastern part of the square. The northwestern and southeastern parts of the square are built up with arched buildings used as shops. On the southeast side of the shops, there were several buildings with mixed yards.

== History ==
The Shah Abbas Square complex was firstly mentioned on the plan of the Ganja fortress of 1797. This architectural ensemble, located in the center of the suburb, consisted of a mosque, a bathhouse and other buildings. The area, elongated in the northeast and southwest directions with the dimensions of 65x320 meters, has an irregular rectangular shape. The Shah Abbas Mosque is located in the narrow southeastern part of the square. Here, the width of the square narrows to 54 meters, and, on the opposite side, it expands to 85 meters. All four sides of the square are surrounded by plane trees. The northwestern and southeastern parts of the square are built up with arched buildings used as shops. On the southeast side of the shops, there were several buildings with mixed yards. Some of them on the plan of 1797 were marked as a market (bazaar), others - as a "silk and paper factory".

The northwestern part of the square was occupied by a large square-shaped market complex, the central gate of which overlooked to the Shah Abbas Square. Ganja madrassah was located next to the Shah Abbas mosque. Behind the mosque there was a cemetery, in the western part, and at a small distance - the bathhouse "Chokyak Hamam".

== Buildings around the square ==
=== Ganja Khan Palace ===
The palace's complex was located in the historical center of Ganja. The complex included several palace buildings, an arched stone gallery, courtyards and fountains, as well as auxiliary buildings. Until the early 1970s, some buildings were still in disrepair, and in 1974 they were demolished, the "Baku" cinema was built on their place. In 2012, the cinema was also demolished, and a new building of the Ganja State Philharmonic was built on its place.

The Ganja Khan's Palace was a residential complex in the form of a castle which consisted of several residential buildings, as well as an arched building named on the map "the arched stone gallery leading to the Khan's building". This building served as a special gate or corridor leading to the palace. The complex had courtyards and several fountains.

=== Ganja State Philharmonic ===
The foundation of the new building of the Ganja State Philharmonic Society was laid on 21 January 2012, during the visit of the Azerbaijani President Ilham Aliyev to Ganja. The opening took place on 10 November 2017 with the participation of Ilham Aliyev.

The modern six-storey building was built in the neoclassical style. The building has premises for administration, rehearsals, a dressing room, rooms for directors and recreation, a buffet. The complex accommodates a concert hall with 1200 seats, a conference hall with 300 seats, 10 boxes and one VIP box. The busts of Uzeyir Hajibeyli, Fikret Amirov, Gara Garayev, Niyazi and Arif Melikov are exhibited on the third floor. In the open air, there is a two-story gallery with a total area of 2000 square meters with two halls and an open area, an observation tower and other buildings.

=== Shah Abbas Mosque ===
This historic mosque was built in the 17th century in the Arran architectural style. The Ganja Juma Mosque, with its general composition, layout, constructive, artistic and decorative features, continues the portal-dome traditions of the Azerbaijani architecture. Along with this, the architecture of the building does not allow a simple repetition of the forms and details, reflecting the conciseness, expressiveness and clarity inherent in the Arran architectural school.

The main building of the complex is the mosque, the construction of which dates back to 1606.

=== Tomb of Javad Khan ===
The tomb of the last monarch of the Ganja Khanate, Javad Khan, was built around his grave in the center of the Shah Abbas Square. The grave and the tombstone were accidentally discovered in 1962 during the construction of a fountain in the center of the square. The mausoleum was built in a quadrangular shape made of baked bricks and covered with a dome in accordance with the style of the Arran school of architecture. The grave of Javad Khan is located in the center of the tomb, and the tombstone is kept in the Ganja Museum of Local History.

=== Ganja Madrasah ===
The building of the madrasah was once located in the central square of Ganja. To nowadays, only 4 rooms and walls of the madrasah that surrounded the mosque of Shah Abbas have survived.

=== "Chokyak Hamam" Bathhouse ===
The domed bath was built in 1606 according to the plan of the architect Sheikh Bahauddin. During its construction, there were used traditional materials of those times: the red brick, and the bonding mixture of egg white, clay and lime.

The name "Chokyak Hamam" (the bath in the hollow) is given thanks to the technical design of the bath. It is built in a recess to maintain the water pressure, and the basement under the building serves as a heating furnace. Thus, when the water was heated, the smoke from the firewood burning under the boiler was sent to the basement where the walls were heated by the steam. On the other hand, the hot water itself was delivered to the place of use through the tiled pipes laid through the wall.

== Gallery ==
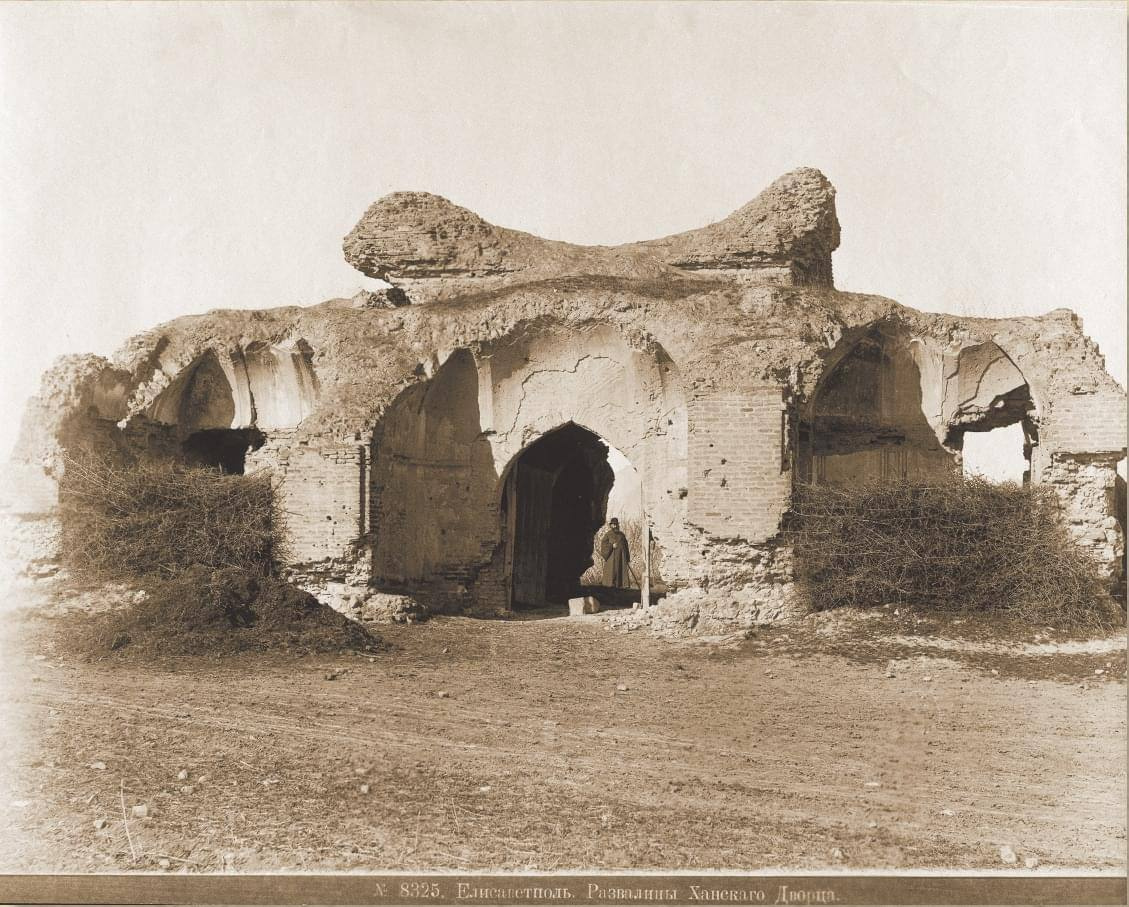
The ruins of the Ganja Khans Palace (ca. XIX)

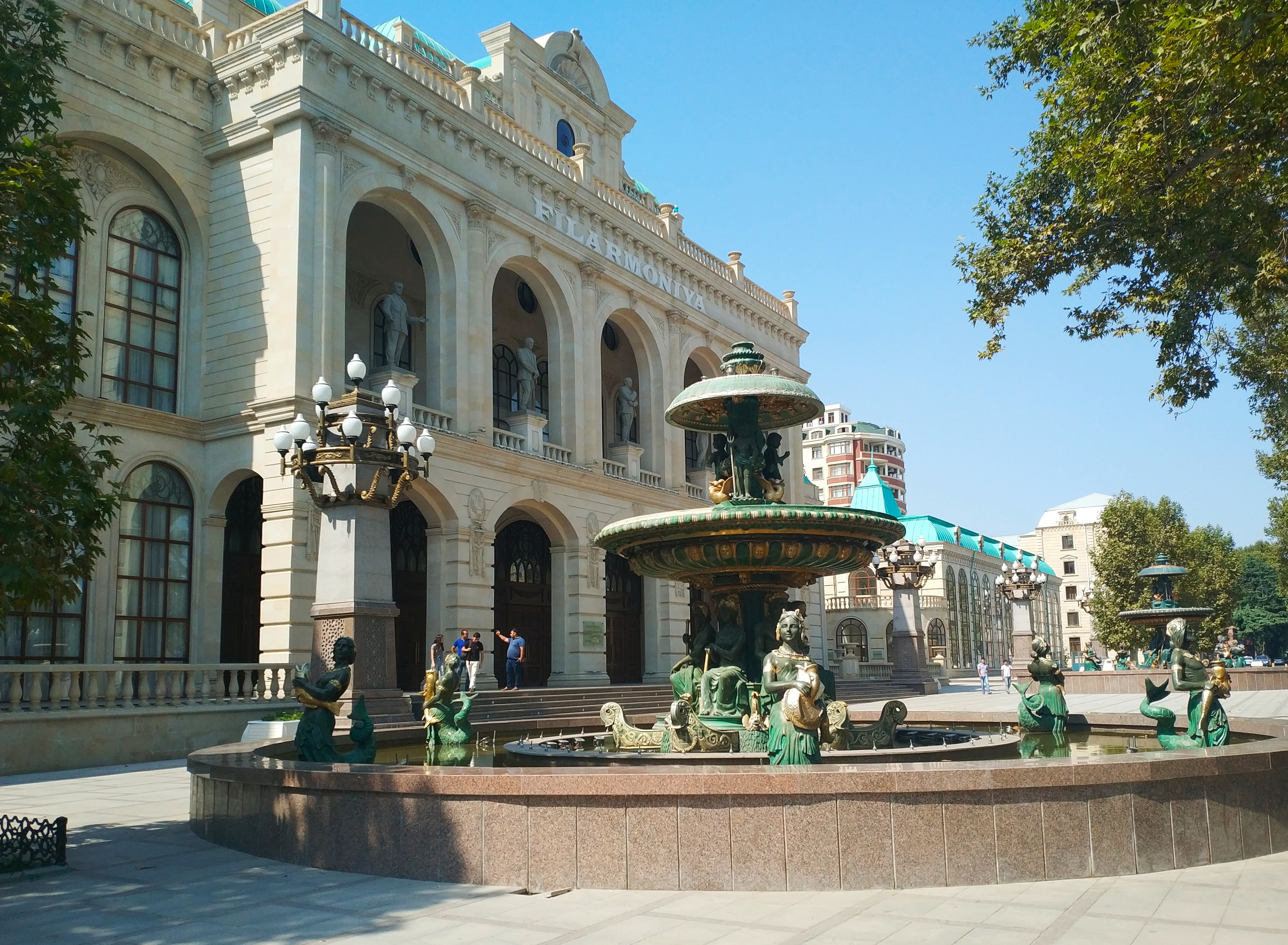
Ganja State Philharmonic

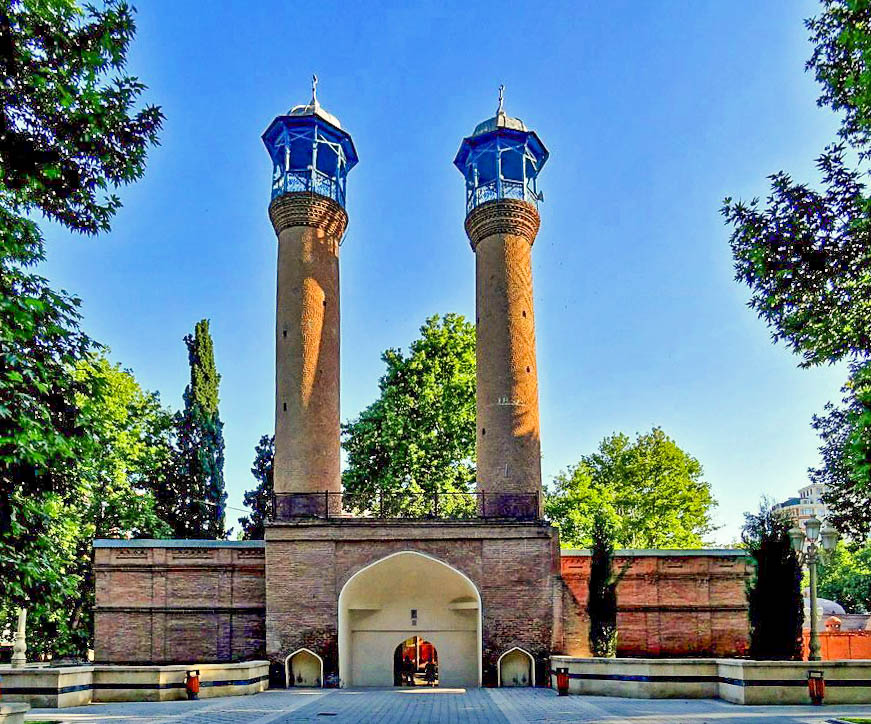
Shah Abbas Mosque

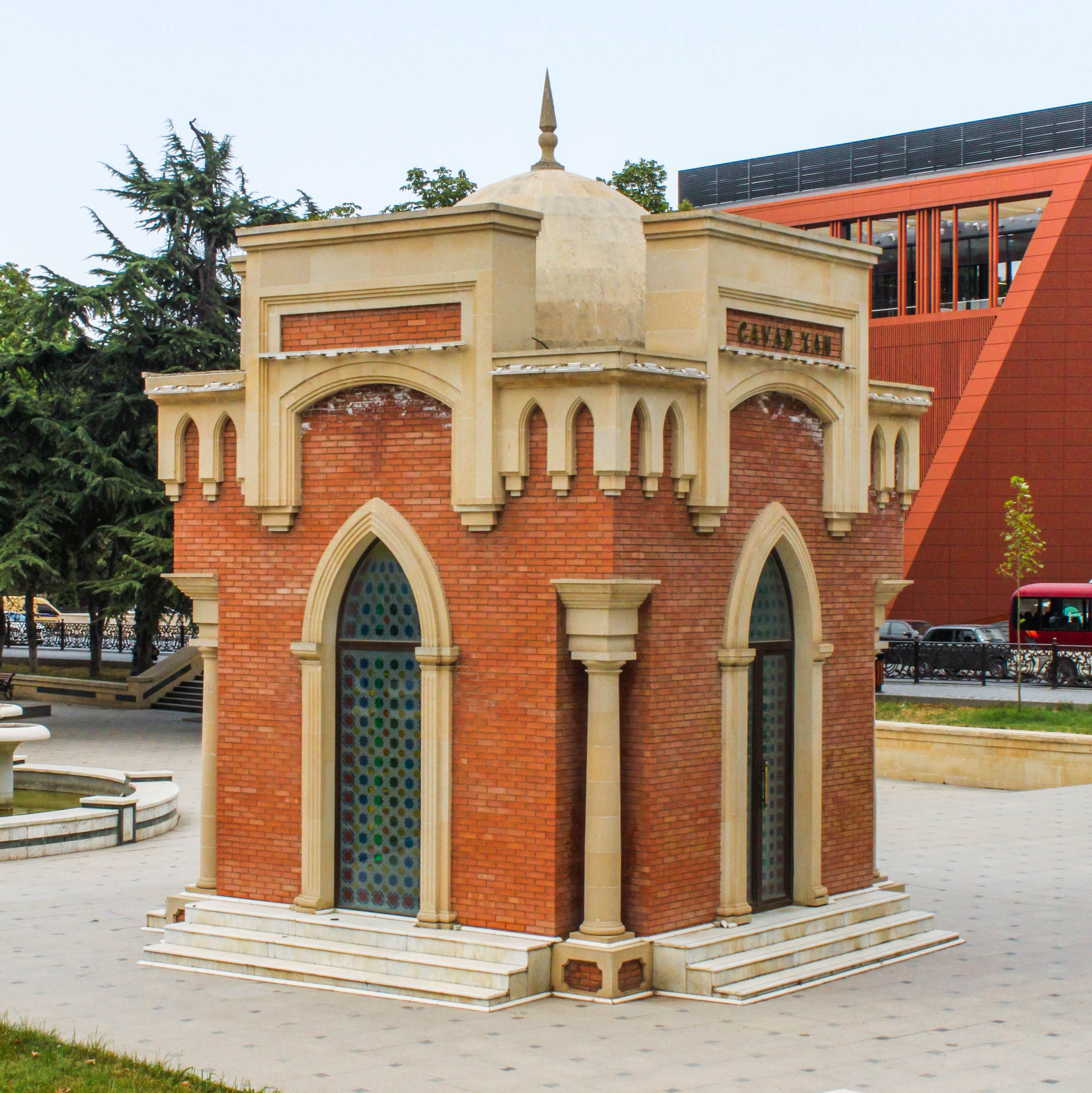
Tomb of Javad Khan

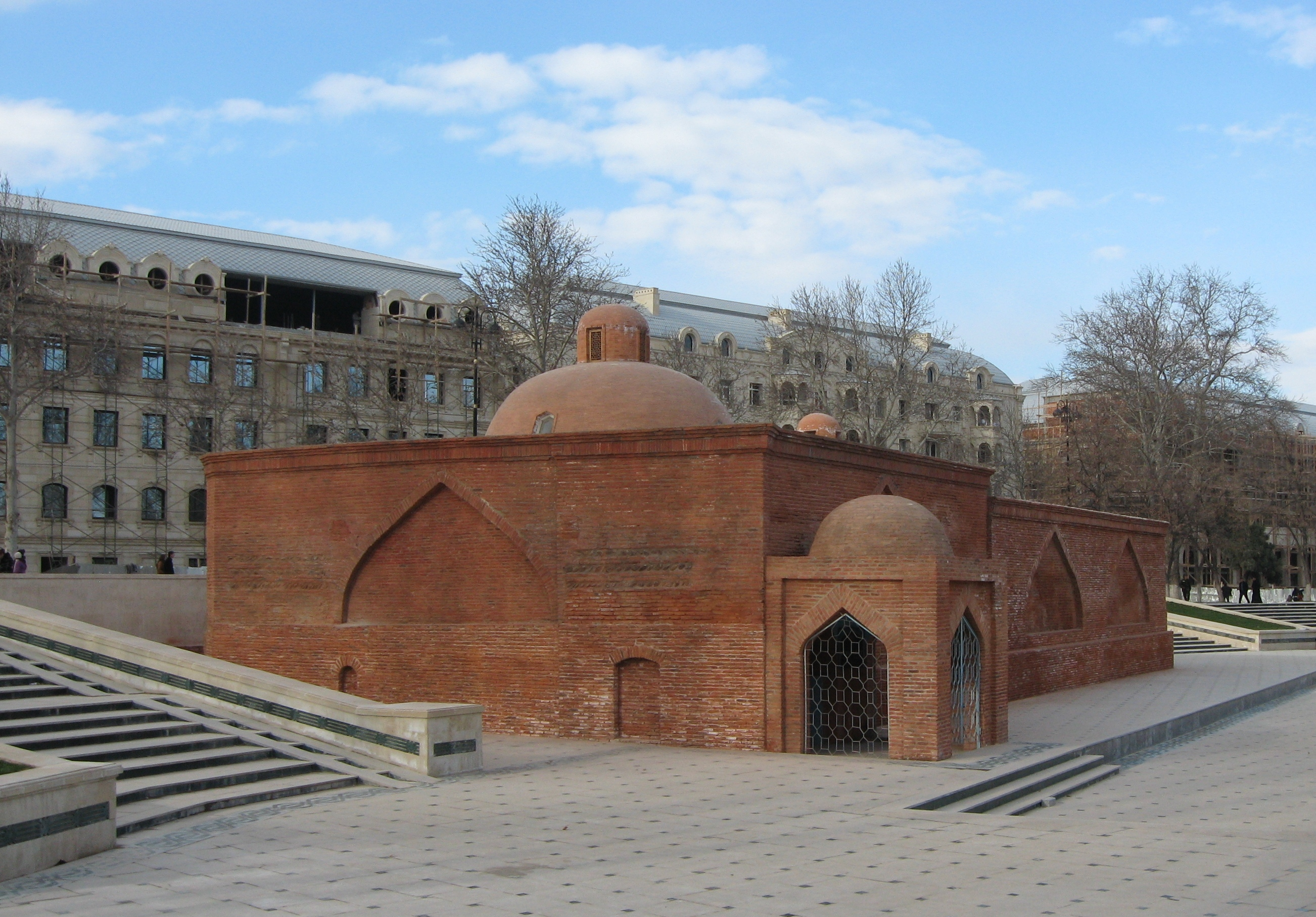
"Chokyak Hamam" Bathhouse

== See also ==
- Divankhana Square
