= Meidan (Shusha) =

Main city square of Shusha

Meidan Meydan
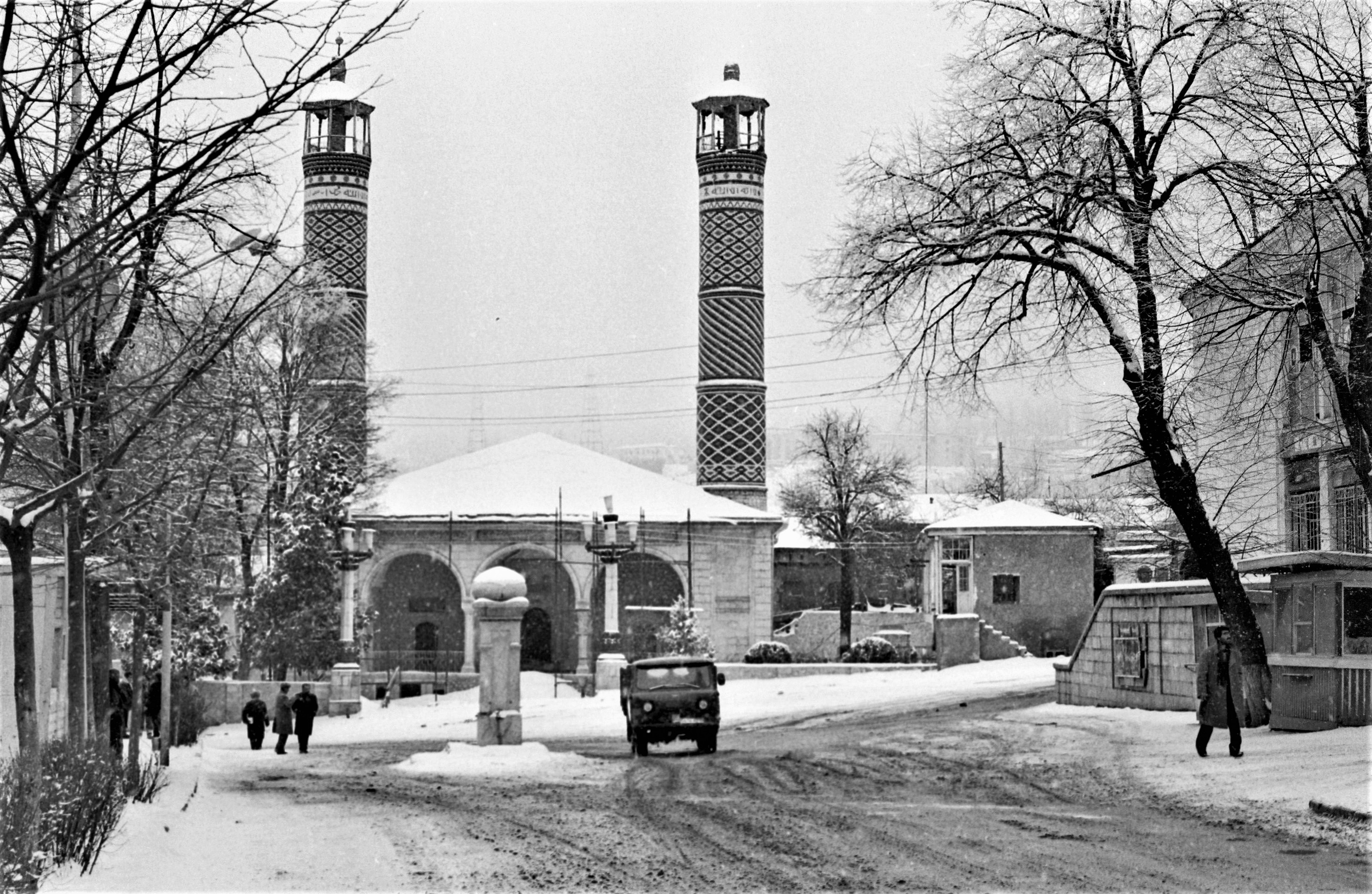
- Meidan in the winter of 1992
- Type: square
- Location: Shusha, Azerbaijan

Construction
- Completion: 19th century

Meidan (Azerbaijani: Meydan, Armenian: Մեյդան) is the main city square of Shusha. Starting from Divankhana Square near the Ganja Gate of Shusha fortress, Rasta Bazaar Street, Shusha's main commercial thoroughfare, ends at the Meidan, thus connecting the Meidan and Divankhana.

== History ==
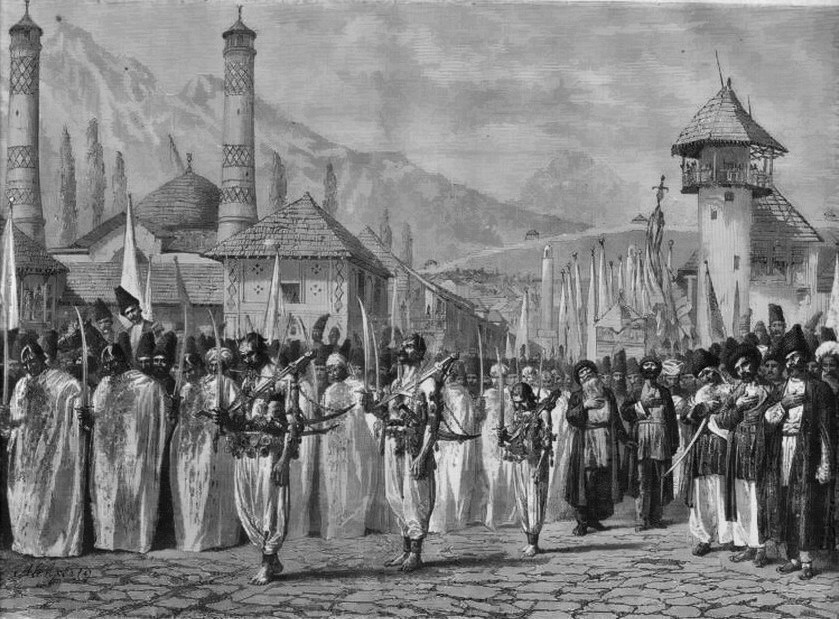
V. Vereshchagin – religious procession during the month of Muharram in Shusha, 1865. The painting depicts a religious ceremony in the square in front of the Yukhari Govhar Agha Mosque.

E. Avalov notes that Meidan Shusha also played an important socio-commercial role in the designation of buildings located around it; big religious ceremonies were held here. The main architectural elements of the square are religious and commercial buildings, which is characteristic of the squares built in the cities of Azerbaijan in the 17th and 18th centuries.

According to the master plan of the city of Shusha, the history of which is unknown, Meidan, the main architectural and commercial complex of the city, was formed around the first religious building. Later, the commercial and other buildings built around such mosques belonged to mosque endowments; the expenses for the maintenance of mosques and madrasahs were covered by the income obtained from the use of these buildings.

By following the formation of the Meidan, it is possible to learn the way of creation of other medieval squares of Shusha. The southern end of the eastern side of Rasta Bazaar Street has been extended in depth by means of adjacent buildings. The method of creating a square by widening a part of the street can also be observed in the example of Shusha's Bazarbashi and Mardinli neighborhood squares. This method, which creates contrast as a result of the intersection of streets, creates a spacious effect even in a small area.

Buildings in the southern part of the square, which continued the one-storey shopping rows extending only from the Ashaghy Bazaar Street, were used for commercial purposes. On the other side, the two-storey building facing the mosque and the other two-storey buildings connected to it on both sides are madrasa buildings. П-shaped madrasa buildings create a large courtyard around the Juma mosque.

== Characteristics ==
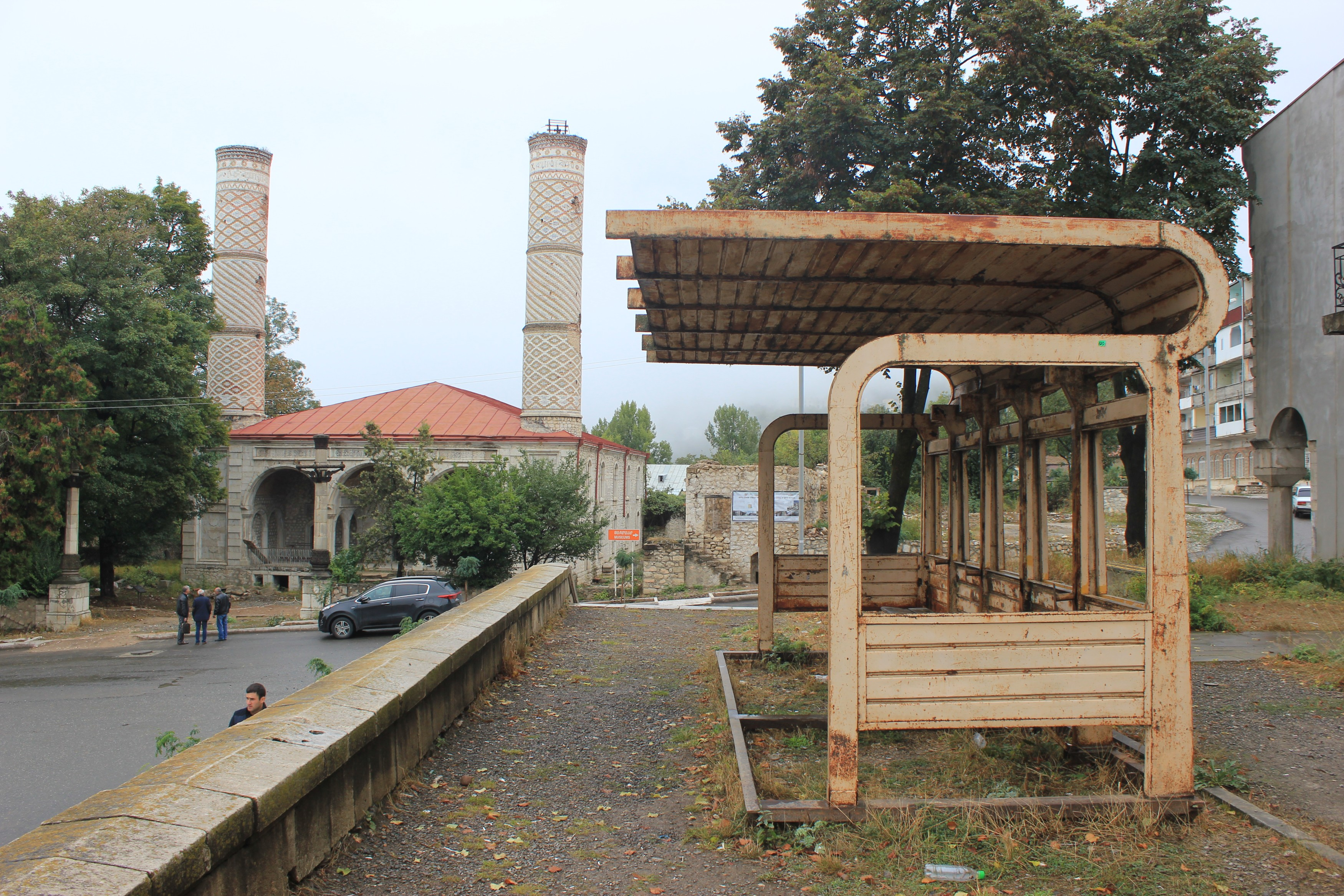
Meidan and Yukhari Govhar Agha Mosque after the capture of Shusha.

The Meidan, stretched along the axis of Rasta Bazaar street, has a rectangular shape. The square is well organized and has a neat appearance.

In the Meidan, which is the planning core not only of the shopping complex, but of the city as a whole, two main commercial highways — Rasta Bazaar and its extension Sheytan Bazaar and Ashaghy Bazaar streets intersect. Unlike Divankhana, which has a flat surface, the Meidan is slightly inclined to the southeast, and the Ashaghy Bazaar Street opens from this part.

The architectural complex of the Meidan includes a caravanserai from the west, and long, one-story commercial rows with large entrances from the east and south. From the south side, those trade rows develop and connect with the trade rows of the Ashaghy Bazaar. This whole composition of the square is completed in the south by the Juma mosque with two minarets of Shusha. The precise verticals of the minarets, visible from a distance, form an effective contrast with the horizontally divided side wings of the square.

High-towered cathedrals built in the central squares of European cities in the Middle Ages dominate the low-rise residential buildings and are visible from all sides, indicating the location of the main shopping streets and squares to the people coming to the city. In the cities of Eastern countries, including Shusha, this role was performed by mosques with tall minarets. That is why the fairly high shaft minarets and central dome of Yukhari Govhar Agha Mosque dominate the architectural composition of the city.

== Sources ==
- Авалов, Э. В. (1977). Архитектура города Шуши и проблемы сохранения его исторического облика. Баку: Элм.
