= Divankhana Square =

- Divanxana (Azerbaijani); Դիվանխանա (Armenian)
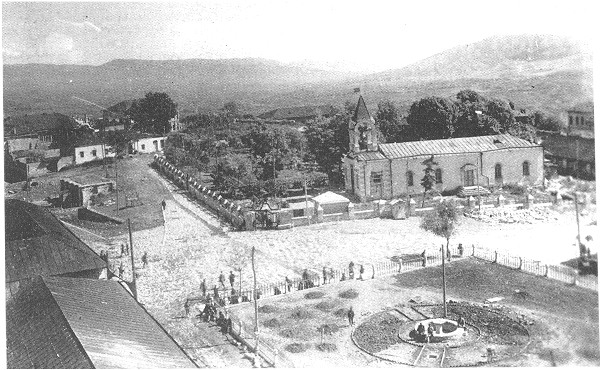
- Photo of the square at the end of the 19th century
- Interactive map of Divankhana Square
- 39°45′44″N 46°44′35″E
- Type: Square
- Location: Shusha, Azerbaijan

History
- Founded: XIX century

Divankhana Square or Bazaar-bashi is the first and the largest city square located at the entrance to Shusha, Azerbaijan from the side of the Ganja Gate. The largest shopping street Rasta Bazaar starts from this area.

== History ==
According to an undated general plan of the city, the Divankhana Square, located in front of the khan's residence, was situated on the territory of the citadel until the first third of the 19th century and was isolated from the city by defensive walls and various buildings. At that time, various auxiliary buildings belonging to the Palace of the Karabakh Khans' complex were located on the territory of the square.

After the annexation of the Karabakh Khanate to the Russian Empire, reconstruction work was carried out in Shusha, as a result of which a part of the fortress walls as well as buildings on the territory of the square were demolished, and it became citywide. The square received a new name - Bazaar-bashi (the beginning of the bazaar). The transformation of one of the main streets, starting from the square, into a large trade highway - Rasta Bazaar, determined the new name of this square, which has survived to nowadays.

== Particularities ==
The Ashaghy Bazaar street - the main shopping street of Shusha since the 18th century, is losing its commercial significance after the reconstruction work in the city. The Rasta Bazaar Street, built at this time, becomes the main shopping street of the city with neat rows of shops lined up in one line. This street originates from the Divankhana Square. From the north, the khan's residence fortified with defensive walls and towers overlooked the Divankhana Square, from the east - the building of Divankhana which after the arrival of the Russian military units in Shusha, as a result of the annexation of the Karabakh Khanate to the Russian Empire, was turned into an Orthodox church.

According to the general plan dated with 1855, there were caravanserais on the southern and western sides of the square, and trading shops on the eastern side. Therefore, this area also played a trading role.

The Divankhan square was located on a relatively calm terrain, adjacent to the khan's residence and to the building of Divankhan. In addition, being near the main fortress gates, it was a convenient place for holding various solemn ceremonies (including the Novruz holiday). The gatherings and military parades of the Khan, and, later, of the Russian troops were held here.

== Buildings around the square ==
=== Palace of the Karabakh Khans ===
The Palace of the Karabakh Khans is a historical palace, the former residence of the founder of the Karabakh Khanate - Panahali Khan. During the reign of Panahali Khan, the palace was not only the residence of the ruler where he lived with his family. The palace, one of the oldest buildings in Shusha, was built simultaneously with the Shusha fortress and was surrounded by the fortress walls. In this sense, the palace of the Karabakh Khan resembles as a fortress inside another one.

The large palace complex located to the north of Divankhan Square is one of the main compositional dominants not only of the square, but also of the city of Shusha (along with the Yukhari Govhar Agha Mosque).

The main entrance of this castle, facing north, as in the Shahbulag castle, was protected from a direct approach by prismatic gate-towers with L-shaped passages extended outwards. The upper parts of Panahali Khan's Shusha castle have not been preserved. E. Avalov noted that in the Shusha castle of Panahali Khan, as well as in the Shahbulag castle and in the castle of Gara Boyuk Khanum, the gate-tower was two-story.

The two-story building of the palace contained numerous rooms, including a large T-shaped front hall which played the role of the building's compositional center. This hall was separated from the outer space by shebeke windows.

=== Caravanserai Bazaar-bashi ===
The caravanserai was located in the south of the Divankhana square creating its border. Its construction dates back to the 19th century. It was located between two parallel streets facing the square from the south - Rasta Bazaar street and the one of Saatly quarter. The caravanserai was built at some distance to the south. This was dictated by the need to ensure the most convenient layout of the Divankhan square, and to better organize it before entering the trade routes.

=== Caravanserai Agha Gahraman Mirsiyab oghlu ===
Built in the 19th century, the Agha Gahraman Mirsiyab oghlu's caravanserai is located in the southeastern part of the Divankhan Square. The building is square on plan. The southern facade of the caravanserai successfully complemented the architectural ensemble of the Divankhana Square.

=== Church of the Holy Great Martyr and Victorious George ===
The Church of the Holy Great Martyr and Victorious George was located in the eastern part of the Divankhan Square. Previously, the Khan's Divankhana was located in this building, and after the arrival of the Russian military units to Shusha, it was converted into an Orthodox church. In 1970, the building was demolished and a cultural center was built on its place.

The temple was a three-aisled basilica. The envelope-shaped roof rested both on rough-hewn facades and on 12 double-row, round, wooden columns of the prayer hall. The church had two arched entrances: from the south and from the west, 8 large windows. The altar of the temple was rectangular on plan.

In the western part of the roof there was a high bell tower, which had a roof typical to Russian classical belfries. From the southwestern corner of the prayer hall, a staircase led to the bell tower.

== See also ==
- Shah Abbas Square

== Literature ==
- Avalov, Elturan (1977). Архитектура города Шуши и проблемы сохранения его исторического облика. Baku: Elm. p. 112.
- Salamzadeh, Abdulvahab (1964). Архитектура Азербайджана XVI-XIX вв. Baku: Академия наук Азербайджанской ССР, Институт архитектуры и искусства. p. 253./
