= Taza Mahalla Mosque =

Mosque in Shusha, Azerbaijan

- Azerbaijani: Təzə Məhəllə Məscidi Arabic: مسجد تازه محله Persian: مسجد تازه محل
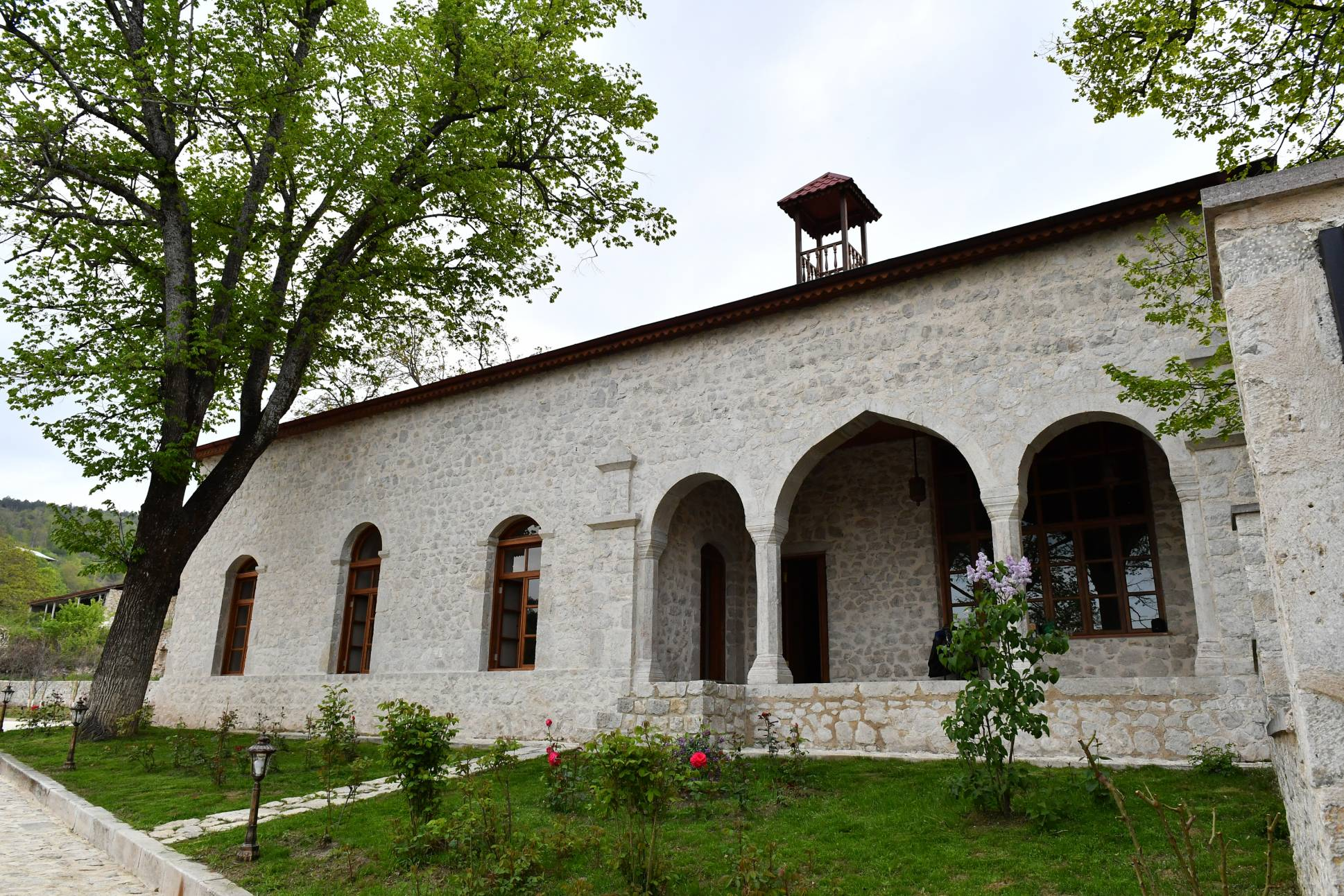
- The mosque façade in 2023, after restoration

- Location of the former mosque in Azerbaijan

Religion
- Affiliation: Shia Islam
- Ecclesiastical or organizational status: Mosque
- Status: Active

Location
- Location: Firudin bey Kocharli street, Shusha, Karabakh
- Country: Azerbaijan
- Interactive map of Taza Mahalla Mosque
- Coordinates: 39°45′24″N 46°45′12″E

Architecture
- Type: Mosque architecture
- Style: Islamic
- Completed: 19th century
- Minaret: Two

The Taza Mahalla Mosque (Azerbaijani: Təzə Məhəllə Məscidi; Persian: مسجد تازه محل; Arabic: مسجد تازه محله) is a Shia Islam mosque, located in Shusha, Azerbaijan.

== Overview ==
The mosque was one of the 17 mosques functioning in Shusha by the end of the 19th century. It was located on Firudin bey Kocharli street of Taza Mahalla neighborhood of Shusha.

Analysis of satellite imagery by the Caucasus Heritage Watch of Cornell University shows that between 1980 and 2004 the mosque remained well-preserved. Between 2004 and 2013, the mosque was renovated by the de facto Armenian authorities and used as a geology museum.

== Etymology ==
The name of the mosque in translation means "New Neighbourhood" referring to the location of the mosque in the relatively new neighborhood of 17 neighbourhoods Shusha.

== See also ==
- Shia Islam in Azerbaijan

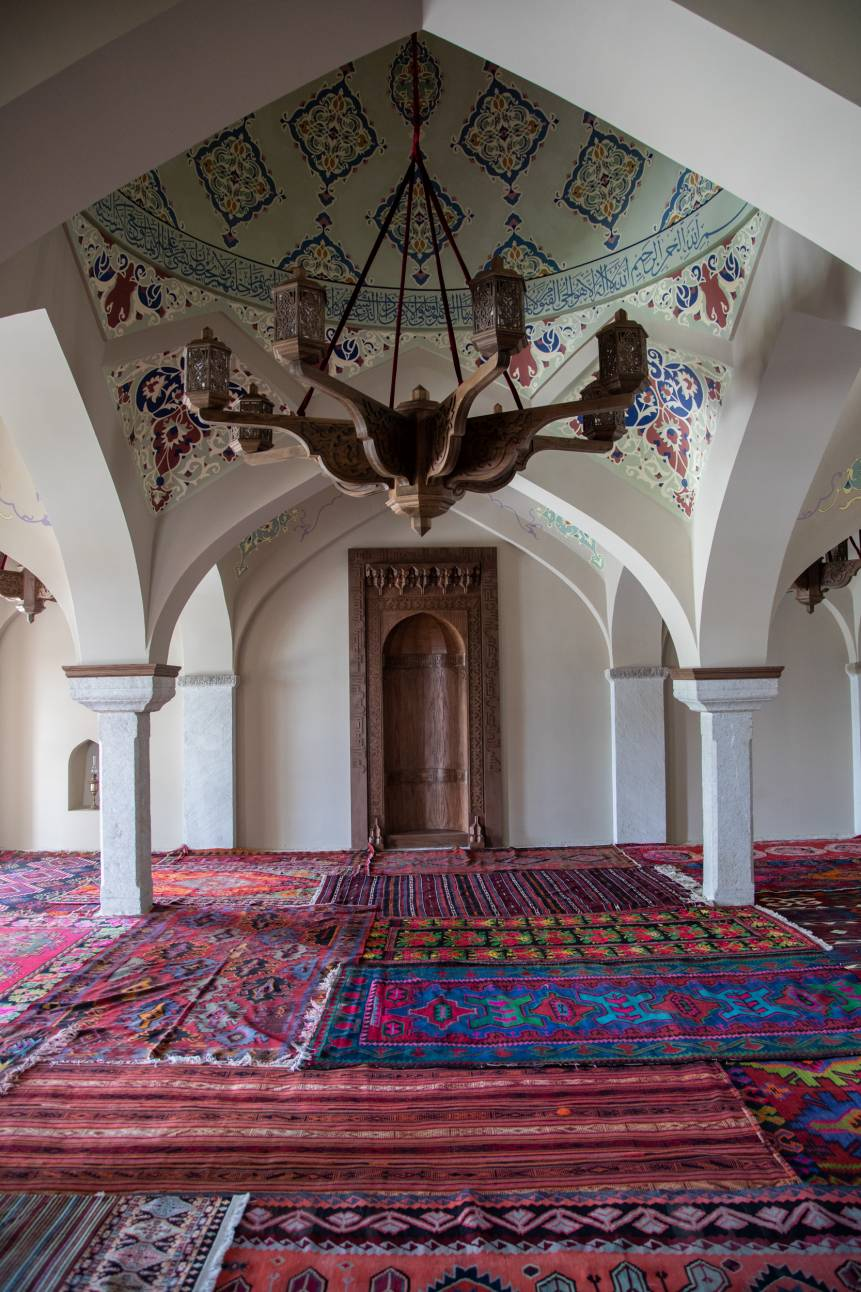
The mosque interior in 2023, after restoration

- List of mosques in Nagorno-Karabakh
