= Kocharli Mosque =

Former mosque in Shusha, Azerbaijan

Coordinates: 39°45′56″N 46°44′46″E

- Azerbaijani: Köçərli Məscidi; Persian: مسجد کوچارلی
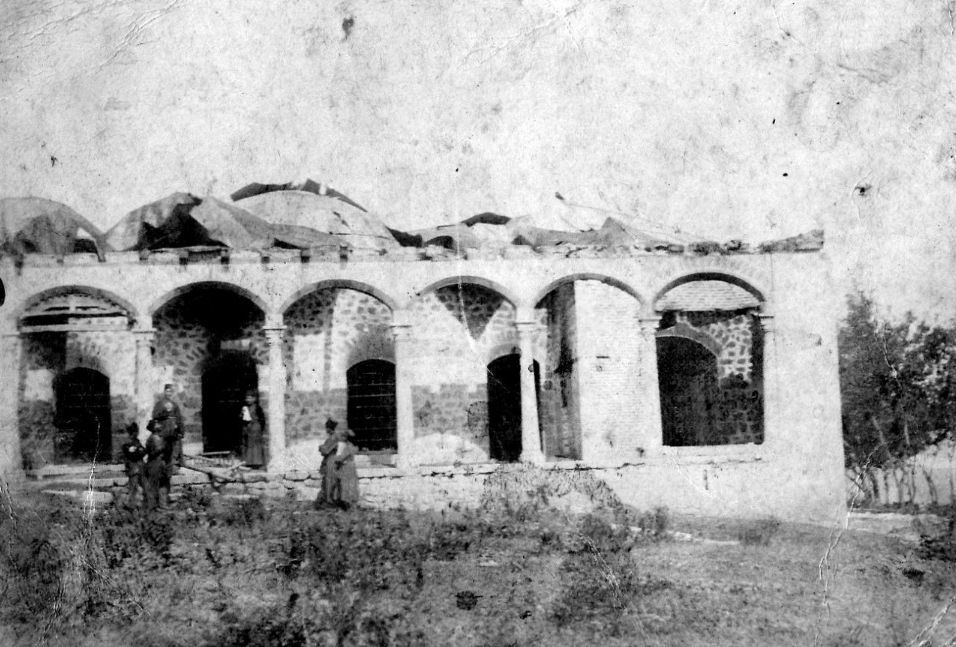
- A 19th-century image of the former mosque

Religion
- Affiliation: Shia Islam (former)
- Ecclesiastical or organizational status: Mosque (former)
- Status: Demolished

Location
- Location: 20 Yanvar Street, Shusha, Karabakh
- Country: Azerbaijan
- Interactive map of Kocharli Mosque

Architecture
- Type: Mosque architecture
- Groundbreaking: 19th century
- Demolished: 20th century

The Kocharli Mosque (Azerbaijani: Köçərli məscidi, Persian: مسجد کوچارلی) was a former Shia Islam mosque, that was located in Shusha, in the Karabakh region. The mosque is no longer standing.

Shusha was under occupation of Armenian forces since the capture of the city on May 8, 1992, until its recapture by Azerbaijan on 8 November 2020.

The mosque was located on 20 Yanvar street of the Kocharli neighborhood of Shusha. Kocharli neighbourhood is one of nine lower neighbourhoods of Shusha. Kocharli Mosque was one of the seventeen mosques functioning in Shusha by the end of the 19th century. The former Kocharli Mosque was located in the UNESCO World Heritage-listed Shusha State Historical and Architectural Reserve.

== See also ==
- Shia Islam in Azerbaijan
- List of mosques in Azerbaijan
