= Chukhur Mahalla Mosque =

Former mosque in Shusha, Azerbaijan

- Azerbaijani: Çuхur Məhəllə Məscidi; Persian: مسجد چوخور محله
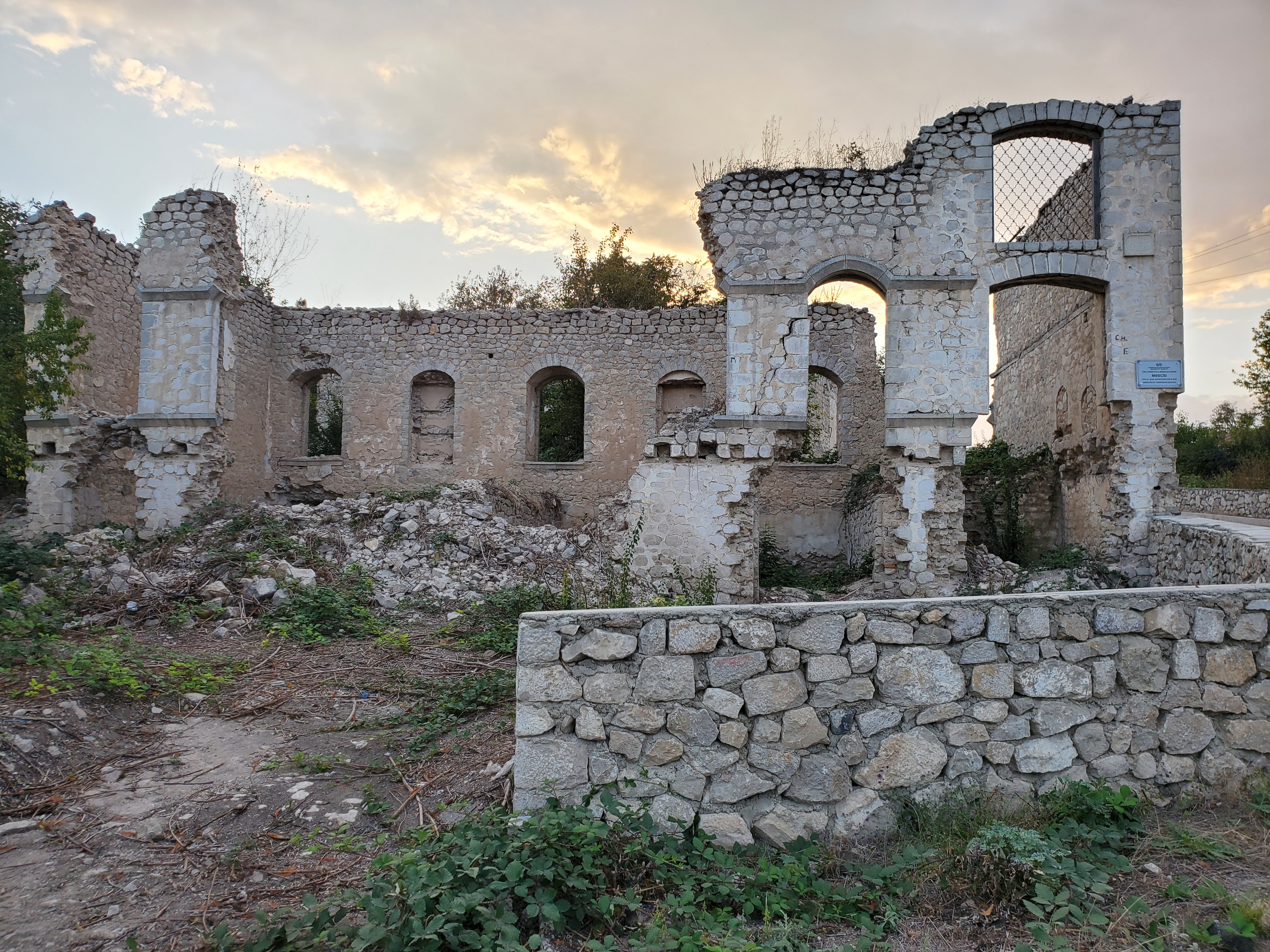
- Ruins of the former mosque in 2021

- Location of the former mosque in Azerbaijan

Religion
- Affiliation: Shia Islam (former)
- Ecclesiastical or organizational status: Mosque (former)
- Status: Abandoned (ruinous state)

Location
- Location: Shusha, Karabakh
- Country: Azerbaijan
- Interactive map of Chukhur Mahalla Mosque
- Coordinates: 39°45′39″N 46°45′25″E

Architecture
- Type: Mosque architecture
- Style: Islamic
- Completed: 18th century
- Minaret: Two (since destroyed)

The Chukhur Mahalla Mosque (Azerbaijani: Çuхur məhəllə məscidi, Persian: مسجد چوخور محله; also known as Azerbaijani: Shefa Ojagi, Persian: استراحتگاه سلامت, lit. 'Place of Cure'), was a former Shia Islam mosque, now in ruins, located in Shusha, in the Karabakh district of Azerbaijan.

Shusha was under occupation of Armenian forces since the capture of the city on May 8, 1992, until its recapture by Azerbaijan on 8 November 2020, during the 2020 Nagorno-Karabakh war.

The mosque was located in the eastern part of Shusha, on N.B. Vazirov Street in the Chukhur Mahalla neighborhood, one of nine lower neighborhoods of Shusha. The Chukhur Mahalla Mosque was one of seventeen mosques in Shusha at the end of the 19th century. The mosque had two minarets.

Shusha was founded in the 1750s, and Chukur neighborhood was populated even before the construction of the walls of Shusha castle was completed.

== See also ==
- Shia Islam in Azerbaijan
- List of mosques in Azerbaijan
