= Qaraqoyunlu =

Qaraqoyunlu or Karakoyunlu may refer to:

- Qara Qoyunlu, Turkoman tribal confederation that ruled Azerbaijan, Armenia, and Iraq in A.D 14-15th centuries
- Qaraqoyunlu, Agsu, Azerbaijan
- Qaraqoyunlu, Barda, Azerbaijan
- Qaraqoyunlu, Goranboy, Azerbaijan
- Qaraqoyunlu, Qubadli, Azerbaijan
- Qaraqoyunlu, Shamkir, Azerbaijan
