= List of Azerbaijani women artists =

This is a list of Azerbaijani women artists who were born in Azerbaijan or whose artworks are closely associated with that country.

== A ==
- Hayat Abdullayeva (1912–2006), sculptor
- Sara Ashurbeyli (1907–2006), painter

== B ==
- Sughra Baghirzada (born 1947), actress, artist, and florist

== E ==
- Rena Effendi (born 1977), Cairo-based Azerbaijani photographer

== H ==
- Elmira Hüseynova (1933–1995), sculptor, portraitist

== K ==
- Geysar Kashiyeva (1893–1972), Georgian-Azerbaijiani painter

== M ==
- Aida Mahmudova (born 1982), contemporary artist
- Zivar Mammadova (1902–1980), sculptor
- Gunay Mehdizade (born 1981), painter
- Gullu Mustafayeva (1919–1994), painter

== R ==
- Maral Rahmanzadeh (1916–2008), painter
- Munavvar Rzayeva (1929–2004), sculptor

== S ==
- Khalida Safarova (1926–2005), painter
- Vajiha Samadova (1924–1965), painter
- Elmira Shahtakhtinskaya (1930–1996), painter
- Sabina Shikhlinskaya (born 1962), contemporary artist

== T ==
- Reyhan Topchubashova (1905–1970), painter

== See also ==
- List of Azerbaijani artists
- People's Artist of Azerbaijan
- People's Artist of the Azerbaijan SSR
