= Mehdigulu Khan Vafa =

Azerbaijani poet (1855–1900)

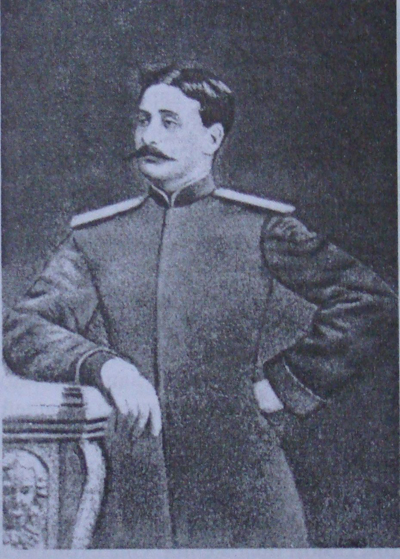
- Mehdigulu in the 1880s
- Born: Mehdigulu Khan Utsmiev; 1855; Shusha, Elisabethpol Governorate, Caucasus Viceroyalty
- Died: 8 September 1900 (aged 44–45); Tbilisi, Tiflis Governorate, Caucasus Viceroyalty
- Wars and battles: Russo-Turkish War (1877–1878)
- Noble family: Utsmiev (paternally); Javanshir clan (maternally)
- Father: Khasay Khan Utsmiyev
- Mother: Khurshidbanu Natavan

Mehdigulu Khan Utsmiyev (Azerbaijani: Mehdiqulu xan Xasay xan oğlu Üsmiyev; 1855, Shusha – 1900, Tiflis) was a lyrical poet in Azerbaijan, who was of Kumyk and Javanshir descent, a lieutenant colonel in the Imperial Russian Army. He authored poetry under pseudonym Vafa (Persian: وفا, lit. 'Loyal').

== Life ==
Mehdigulu was born in 1855 in Shusha in the family of a Kumyk major-general, Khasay khan Utsmiyev (1808–1866) and Azerbaijani poet Khurshidbanu Natavan. He was named after Mehdigulu Khan, last khan of Karabakh Khanate.

In 1859, Alexandre Dumas wrote about him: "a five- or six-year-old boy probably instinctively holding a kinjal... This was a really sharp dagger, which a French mother would never give to her child."

== Military career ==
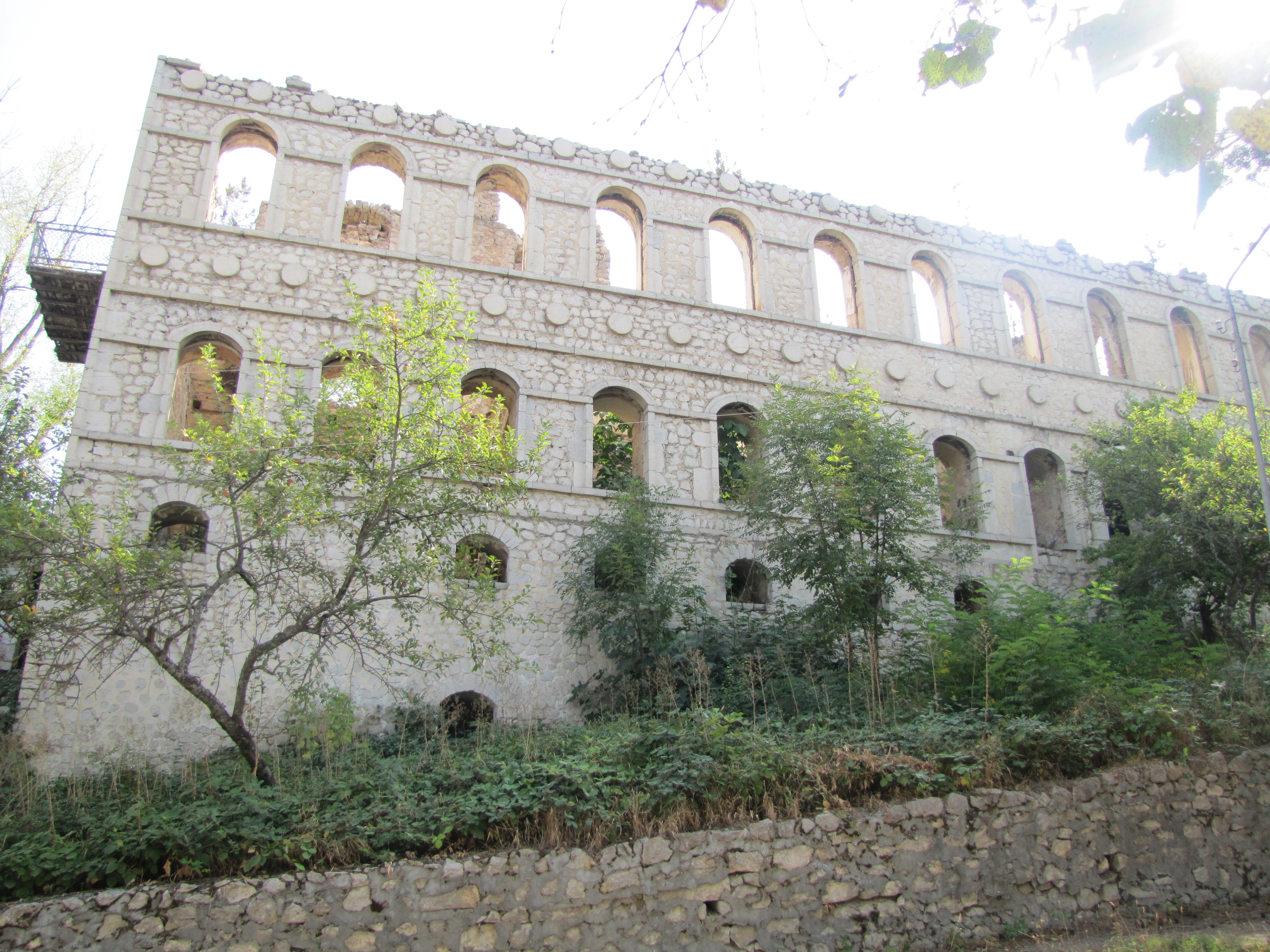
Utsmiev's Palace in Shusha

He enrolled in the military in 1871 and received a silver medal the same year "For greeting the Sovereign Emperor in Tiflis in 1871". He was later to promoted to Praporshchik on 9 November 1871. By 1876 he continued to the cavalry branch, assigned to a squadron. In 1877, he was put under the commander of Caucasus Military District for special assignments.

Joining Russo-Turkish War of 1877–1878, he usually fought under Iosif Gurko, who led the spearhead of the Russian invasion, took Tarnovo on July 7, crossed the Balkans by the Haim Boaz pass—which debouches near Hainkyoi—and, despite considerable resistance, captured Uflani, Maglizh and Kazanlak; on July 18 he participated attack on Shipka, which was evacuated by the Turks the following day. He returned to the Caucasus after Treaty of Berlin and received awards for his bravery and participation.

He was transferred to the Life Guards Cossack Regiment of His Majesty with the rank of cornet on April 21, 1879. He served from 1890 to 1895 as Rittmeister of the army cavalry and as adjutant to the commander of Caucasus Military District. Later in 1895, he received his highest rank of lieutenant colonel. He served as a staff officer from 1897 to 1900 of Caucasus Military District.

According to his service record, Utsmiev owned a family estate consisting of two houses in the city of Shusha, two caravanserais near Khankendi, gardens, mills, and also an uninhabited estate acquired with his sister in Khasavyurt. He was also granted estates in the Shusha: Malıbəyli, Qiyaslı, Xıdırlı, Bilaghan, Ahmadvar, Qarvand-Meydan, Salvard, Qaraqoyunlu, İlxıçılar, etc. He died in 1900 in Tiflis and was buried in Aghdam.

== Family ==
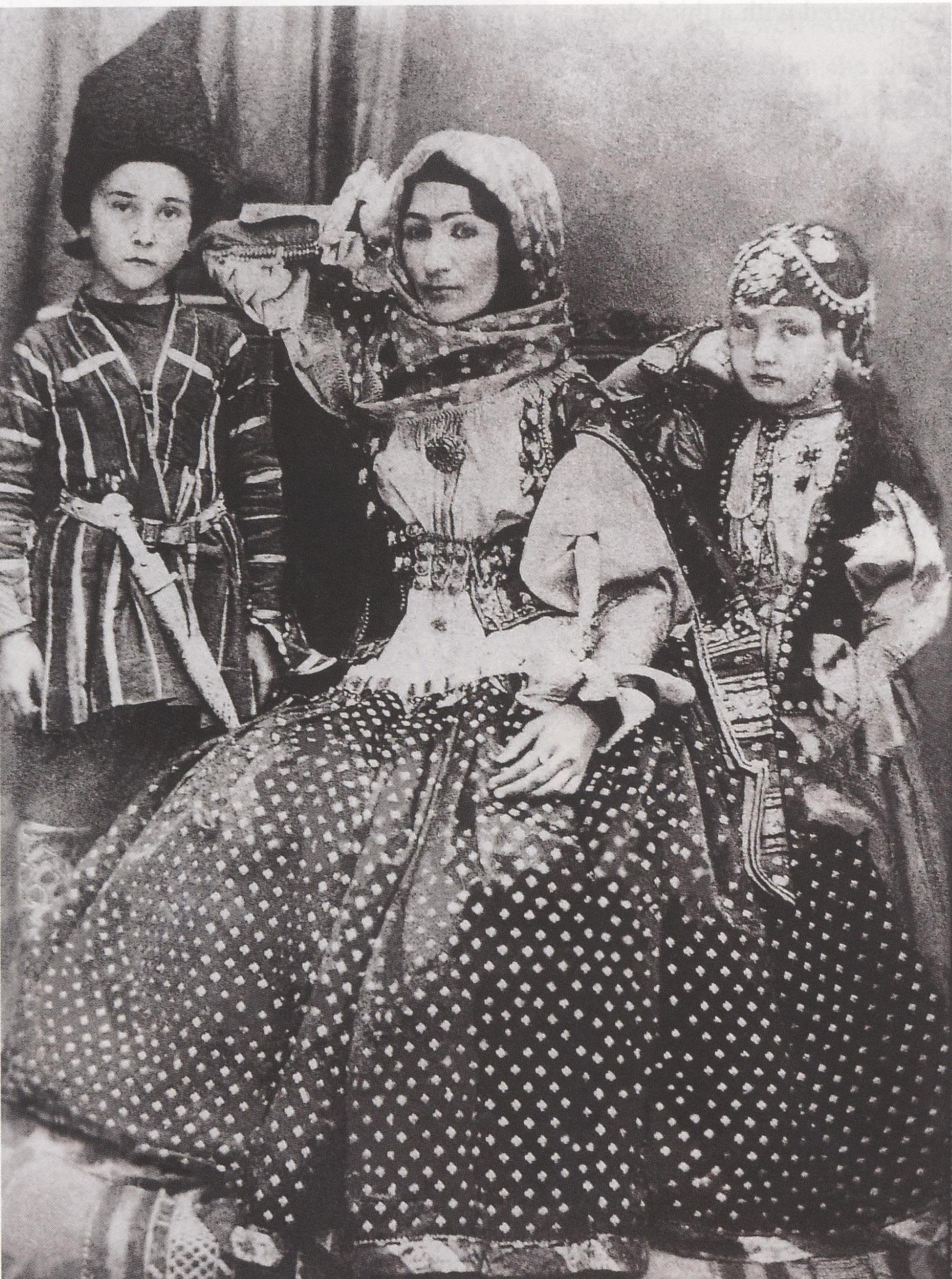
Mehdigulu Khan (left) with his mother Khurshidbanu Natavan and sister Khanbike

He married his 2nd cousin Saltanatbeyim Javanshir (daughter of Karim agha Javanshir (1826–1907), a grandson of Ibrahim Khalil Khan) in 1871 and had a son and 3 daughters:

1. Agha Bike (August 1873 - 1942) — married Akbar Mirza Qajar (grandson of Bahman Mirza via Reza Qoli Mirza)
  1. Reza Qoli Mirza
  2. Rukn al-Din Mirza
  3. Dilshad Qajar — Maid of Honour to Empress Maria Alexandrovna, married to Isgandar bey Rustambayov
  4. Saray Melik
2. Bilgeyisbike (July 1874 - )
3. Azizabike (b. January 1876)
4. Khasay Utsmiev (28 August 1881 - 6 October 1925) — married Sariyya Rustambayova (his own niece Dilshad's daughter) and later Sofia Yastremskoy
  1. Mehdi Utsmiev (6 February 1906, Shusha - 17 January 1993, Moscow)
  2. Said Utsmiev (6 January 1907, Tbilisi - 15 August 1998)
  3. Leyla Utsmieva (19 September 1910 - 8 June 1996, Baku)

== Awards and decorations ==
- 4th class Order of St. Anna with inscription "For Bravery" (25 September 1877)
- 3rd class Order of St. Stanislaus with sword and bow (25 September 1877)
- 3rd class Order of St. Anna with sword and bow (3 November 1877)
- 4th class Order of St. Vladimir (3 November 1877)
- Order of the Cross of Takovo (awarded by Milan I of Serbia on 21 February 1880)
- 3rd class Order of the Lion and the Sun (30 September 1881)
- 2nd class Order of St. Stanislaus (30 August 1887)
- 2nd class Order of St. Anna (30 August 1891)
- Light bronze medal in memory of Russo-Turkish War of 1877–1878 (awarded by Alexander III of Russia on unknown date)
