= Statue of Khurshidbanu Natavan (Waterloo, 2016) =

Statue of an Azerbaijani poet

The Statue of Khurshidbanu Natavan
- Azerbaijani: Xurşidbanu Natəvanın heykəli
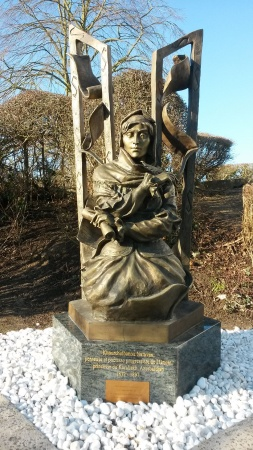
- Interactive map of The Statue of Khurshidbanu Natavan
- Location: Waterloo, Belgium
- Coordinates: 50°43′09″N 4°22′45″E
- Designer: Imran Mehdiyev
- Material: bronze
- Opening date: February 18, 2016
- Dedicated to: Khurshidbanu Natavan

Statue of Khurshidbanu Natavan - a 19th century Azerbaijani poet, daughter of the last khan of Karabakh Mehdigulu khan Javanshir, a statue of Khurshidbanu Natavan erected in 2016 in the central park of Waterloo, Belgium.

== About ==
The opening ceremony of the monument to Azerbaijani poet Khurshidbanu Natavan was held on February 18, 2016 in Waterloo, Belgium. The ceremony was also attended by Ambassador Extraordinary and Plenipotentiary of Azerbaijan to the Kingdom of Belgium Fuad Isgandarov and Mayor of Waterloo Floran Rotter. The pedestal of the statue in the central park of Waterloo reads: "Khurshidbanu Natavan, a modern enlightener and poetess of the East, Princess of Karabakh, Azerbaijan." The statue was created by sculptor Imran Mehdiyev under the direction of People's Artist of Azerbaijan Tahir Salahov.

The richly dressed figure of Khurshidbanu Natavan, made in a sitting position, is distinguished by its plastic solution and subtleties of construction. In this bronze statue, the author has created a lyrical-psychological, memorable image of the poetess, who has a great reputation among the people. Natavan's thoughtful and sad appearance in the work is perceived as an artistic sign that her life was contradictory and painful.

== Vandalism against the statue ==
In March 2020, an act of vandalism was registered against the statue of Khurshidbanu Natavan. The inscription on the monument saying "Khurshidbanu Natavan, a modern enlightener and poetess of the East, princess of Karabakh, Azerbaijan" was torn off and paint was splashed on the statue. A criminal case was opened by Waterloo police after the incident.

== See also ==
- Khurshidbanu Natavan
- Bust of Khurshidbanu Natavan
