= Monument to Mikayil Mushfig =

Monument in Baku, Azerbaijan

- Azerbaijani: Mikayıl Müşfiqin heykəli
- Interactive map of Monument to Mikayil Mushfig
- Location: Baku, Azerbaijan
- Coordinates: 40°22′55″N 49°49′22″E
- Designer: Munavvar Rzayeva
- Type: Memorial
- Material: marble
- Height: 3.2 m
- Opening date: 1970
- Dedicated to: Mikayil Mushfig

The Monument to Mikayil Mushfig (Azerbaijani: Mikayıl Müşfiqin heykəli) is a monument dedicated to the Azerbaijani poet Mikayil Mushfig, raised on one of the central avenues of Baku, the capital of Azerbaijan.

== History ==
The monument was raised in 1968 on İnshaatchilar Avenue. The monument's unveiling took place on 9 June 1970. The opening ceremony was attended by the People's Poets of Azerbaijan Rasul Rza, Suleiman Rustam, and the People's Writer - Mirza Ibrahimov. Munavvar Rzayeva is the sculptor of the monument, and Shafiga Rzayeva is the architect.

In February 2017, as part of the reconstruction of Nariman Narimanov Avenue, the monument was already restored and new benches were installed in the park near the monument where landscaping works were carried out.

== Description ==
The bust's height is 1.5 meters, and the entire monument is 3.2 meters. The name and surname of the poet are written on the pedestal in gold letters based on Latin graphics.
