= Hayat Abdullayeva =

Azerbaijani sculptor

Hayat Hamdulla qizi Abdullayeva
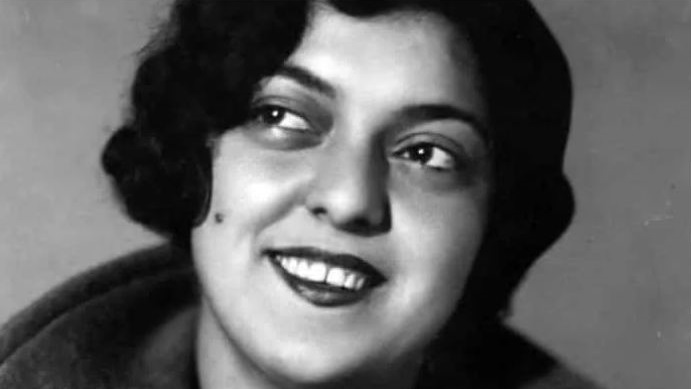
- Born: Hayat Hamdulla qizi Abdullayeva; October 14, 1912; Derbent, Dagestan Oblast, Russian Empire
- Died: April 21, 2006 (aged 93); Baku, Azerbaijan
- Education: St. Petersburg Academy of Arts in the name of Ilya Repin
- Notable work: Bust of Molla Panah Vagif (1957); Bust of Khurshidbanu Natavan (1982)

Hayat Hamdulla qizi Abdullayeva (14 October 1912, Derbent - 21 April 2006, Baku) was an Azerbaijani sculptor and honored art worker.

== Biography ==
Hayat was born in the city of Derbent. She was the daughter of the famous fish merchant Hamdulla Abdullayev. After the execution of her father, she was exiled with her mother to Kazakhstan.

In 1942, she entered the evacuated Repin Institute of Painting, Sculpture and Architecture (now Repin Institute of Arts), from Leningrad to Samarkand. In those years, she created the sculptures "Tutu khanim" and "Hasan bey Zardabi". She became the first Azerbaijani woman in the field of easel sculpture.

After completing her studies, she arrived to Baku, where she was a teacher at the Azim Azimzade Azerbaijan State Art School. She learned in the workshop of artist Petr Sabsay.

== Creations ==
Abdullayeva worked in the decorative and easel sculpture field. The lyrical theme prevailed in Abdullayeva's small sculptures.

If in such compositions as "Motherhood" and "Lullaby", the sculptor sings maternal love, then she dedicates her two-figure sculpture to the enamoured. The poetic images of a guy and a girl made of wood, contemplating the world of love, dreams, and desires, convey a feeling of tenderness.

Among the famous works of the author, one can note the sculpture "Hajar" (1959), the colourful decorative figures reflecting the characters from Nizamis poem "Seven Beauties"(1959). Sometimes this composition, being represented by porcelain figurines, is called the “Seven Beauties and Bahram Shah”. Despite the diverse images of the girls, that differ in movements and clothes, the author managed to create a whole composition. The artistic images of the poet Nizami Ganjavi, famous in the East, performed by Abdullayeva, received a new and original interpretation. The theme, to which the author turned, itself forces the sculptor to emphasize the brilliance and exoticism of this image. At the same time, the professional flair, the knowledge of the technological qualities of the porcelain, the emanating from the nature and textured capabilities of the material, gave an impetus to the emergence of this decorative composition. The figures attract not only by their plasticity, but also by their logical completeness from the point of view of the typical elements of expressions.

The 1950s were fruitful for Abdullayeva in the field of the small plastic genre. The caricature of "Meshedi Ibad" and his aunt from the operetta "Arshin Mal Alan" revealed the decorative talent of the sculptor as well as the ability to express the figurative composition of the depicted face. The types from the "Seven Beauties", the "Talysh Gizi", the "Girl Weaving a Basket", the "Woman with a Child", and other small-volume porcelain and ceramic figures, are the first examples of the authors defining creative prospects, and the ceramic works of the "Seven Beauties" and the "Woman with a child" speak about the breadth of Hayat Abdullayevas creative possibilities. Such works as "Lullaby", "Youth", "Hajar" (walnut tree), in their lyricism, are not inferior to the above-mentioned ones. The professionalism prevailing in these sculptures is reflected in her subsequent works, among which should be noted the sculpture "Without You" - a girl in a raincoat with a raised collar and hands in her pockets conveying a sad mood.

Abdullayeva also created a sculpture dedicated to Alia Rustamova, a partisan doctor who fought in the forests of Smolensk during World War II. Another sculpture, titled "The Game", depicts a girl sitting at a chessboard and is physically characterized by a long, flexible neck and intentionally unfinished arms. The work was designed by the sculpture to represent the subject's internal focus on the game.

Over the years of her creative activity, Abdullayeva has also created a number of major works, including the sculpture of Maxim Gorky installed on the pediment of the National Library named after M. F. Akhundov, the bronze sculptures of the famous actor Huseyngulu Sarabsky, of the statesman and poet Shah Ismail Khatai, the monument-busts of Khurshidbanu Natavan and one of the poet Vagif in the city of Shusha.

In 1964, she was awarded the title of the Honored Art Worker.

Abdullayeva died on 21 April 2006 in Baku.

== Heritage ==
In 2014, the Nizami Cinema Centre in Baku hosted the premiere of a documentary film by the Azerbaijani director Yaver Rzayev "The Light of My Eyes and the Amazing Life of a Sculptor", dedicated to the 100th anniversary of H. Abdullayeva.

== See also ==
- List of Azerbaijani women artists
- Zivar Mammadova
- Elmira Hüseynova
- Munavvar Rzayeva
