= Ughurlu Khan of Ganja =

Ughurlu Khan

Khan of Ganja
- Reign: 26 July 1826 – 1827
- Predecessor: Title last held by Javad Khan
- Born: c. 1781; Ganja, Ganja Khanate
- Died: c. 1828 (aged 46–47); Tabriz, Qajar Iran
- Wars and battles: Russo-Persian War (1804–1813); Russo-Persian War (1826–1828)
- Noble family: Ziyadoghlu Qajar
- Father: Javad Khan
- Mother: Shukufa khanum

Ughurlu Khan (Azerbaijani: Uğurlu xan Ziyadoğlu-Qacar) or Oghurlu Khan was a claimant to Khanate of Ganja and a member Ziyadoghlu Qajar, a clan of the Qajar tribe.

== Background ==
Ughurlu Khanv was born around 1781 to Javad Khan of Ganja and his first wife Shukufa khanum (d. 1812). He was named after his grand-grandfather Ughurlu Khan (d. 1738), who served as beylerbey of Karabakh from 1702 to 1738.

== Life ==
As he was the eldest son of Javad, he was demanded as hostage by Pavel Tsitsianov in 1803. He managed to flee Ganja together his brother Ali Qoli during Russian siege of the city in 1804 and take a refuge with Shirin beg of Samukh. Tsitsianov asked them to appear before him in Tiflis in 1804 and promised safety. However Ughurlu chose to escape via Shirvan Khanate and join Qajar crown prince Abbas Mirza instead.

=== Russo-Persian war of 1804–1813 ===
He commanded a part of Qajar army during Russo-Persian war of 1804–1813. He camped on the shores of Tartar river in 1806 and sent messages to local Muslims to rise up against Russians when Abbas Mirza captured Askeran Fortress. According to archival records, he also promised safety to Christians of Ganja. Although he petitioned the Russian government with permission to return to Ganja in 1807, alongside 779 members of nobility this petition was left without answer.

He wrote another letter to Kazakh mouravi Joseph Bebutov (father of Vasili Bebutov) on 11 September 1808, informing him of recent Franco-Persian alliance and Askar Khan Afshar's appointment as ambassador, threatening with an exaggerated possible French attack against Russia. He was left behind with 12000 men near Khachbulag when Abbas Mirza's army crossed Dilijan for unsuccessful attack at Ganja in 1809. He forced some tribesmen from Ayrum tribe to resettle in Nakhchivan in 1810, when Abbas Mirza tried to invade Karabakh but was defeated at Meghri on the Aras River. Later in 1811, he was approached by Alexander Tormasov, Russia viceroy of Georgia who promised him full immunity and stipend, should he decide to submit to Russia. After fruitless talks, new viceroy in Georgia, Filippo Paulucci sent Ughurlu Khan's mother and daughter to him in 1812 instead, citing waste of economic resources.

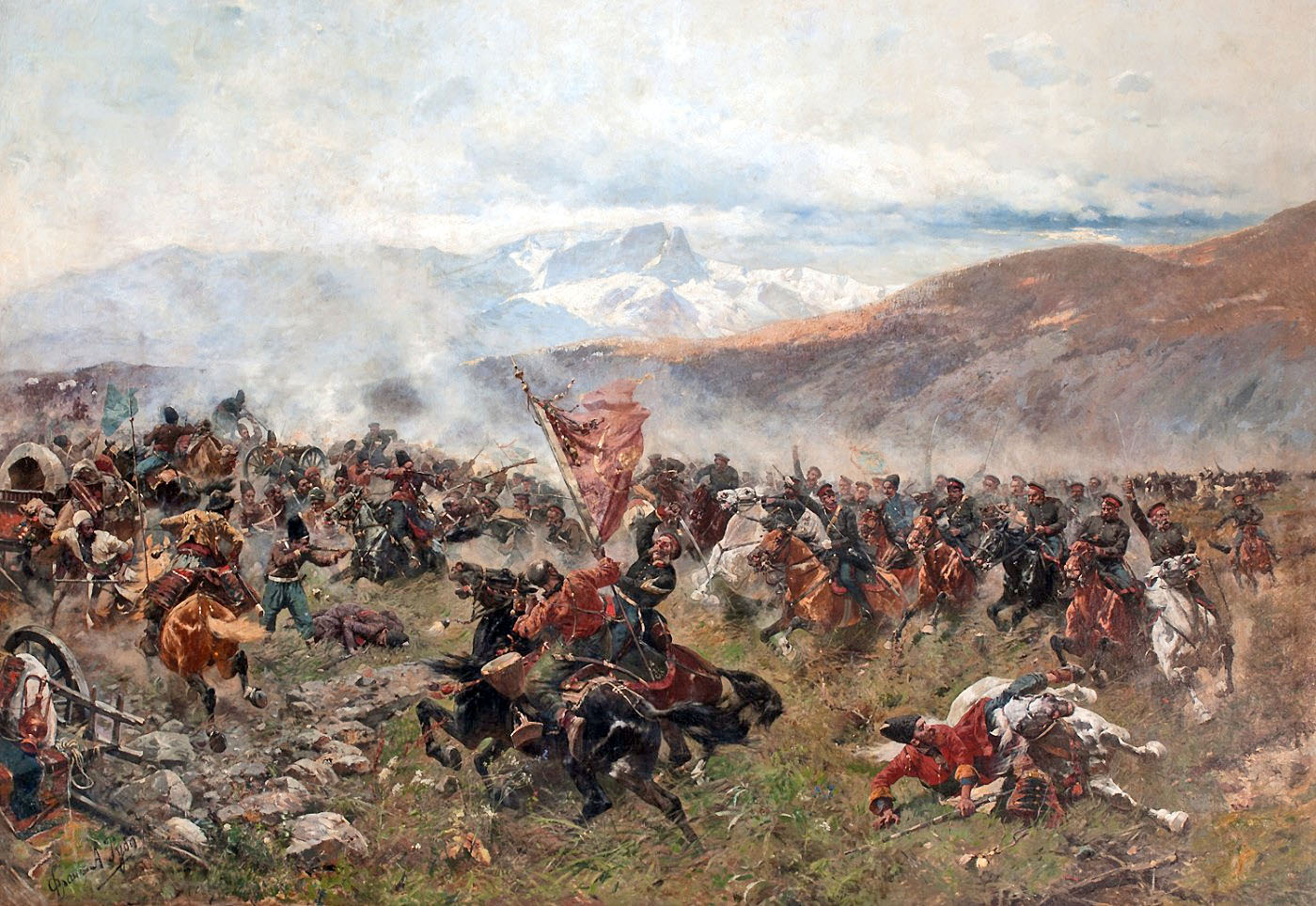
Battle of Ganja by Franz Roubaud

=== Russo-Persian war of 1826–1828 ===
He returned to Caucasus again in the army of Abbas Mirza in 1826. On July 16, 1826, troops under the command of Abbas Mirza attacked the camp of Russian troops near Shirak. While khan of Erivan, Hossein Qoli advanced in the direction of Ganja to occupy it, Abbas Mirza surrounded the fortress of Shusha, which by that time was in the hands of the Russians. Ganja was easily occupied as new viceroy Yermolov ordered retreat. Ughurlu who entered the city accompanying prince Mohammad, was declared as new Khan of Ganja by the decree of Abbas Mirza on 26 July.

But the capture of Shusha was delayed which made it possible for the Russian troops to gather strength and attack Qajar amy. Abbas Mirza was forced to leave the siege of Shusha and attack the Russian troops near Shamkhor, where he was defeated. Ughurlu khan was among the prisoners of war but was released later. On September 13, the troops met again on the Guru Gobu plain near the tomb of the poet Nizami. A part of the right wing of the Iranian army was commanded by Ugurlu Khan. However, battle was a disaster for Iranian side. Ughurlu khan this time left for Tabriz, taking her sister Pusta khanum with him and died very soon after Turkmenchay treaty.

== Family ==
He married Sharaf Jahan begüm, daughter of his uncle Muhammad Khan in 1801 and had several children with her:

1. Badr Jahan Begüm (1802–1861) — married to Mehdigulu khan of Karabakh
2. Muhammad Qoli Khan
3. Haji Javad Khan (died in Tanahat)
4. Nazanin begüm — married to Musahib-agha (1799–1845), son of her uncle Hossein Qoli (1784–1804)
5. Böyük begüm — married to Kalb Ali khan of Maku.
6. Telli begüm — married to Pasha Khan, son of Fezi beg Javanshir (a son-in-law and a cousin of Ibrahim Khalil of Karabakh)

Azerbaijani poet Khurshidbanu Natavan was Ughurlu's granddaughter. Mehdigulu Khan Vafa, a lieutenant-colonel of Russian army was his great-grandson. His descendants in Iran were known with the surname Ganjaei (Persian: گنجه ای). His grandson Haji Reza was a successful merchant in Tabriz, his son Ali Naqi Ganjaei (1872-4 October 1929) was one of the leaders of the Constitutional Movement and served in Majles in 1928–1929, representing Tabriz. His son Reza Ganjaei (1918-1995) was a professor and a politician who served as Minister of Industries and Mines under Hossein Ala' government in 1955–1956. He was famous for publishing Baba Shamal satirical magazine in Tabriz. Reza's brother Javad Ganjaei was Minister of Posts and Telegraphs of Iran in 1949 during Mohammad Sa'ed government and served as a member of Majles until 1953.

== Sources ==
- Bournoutian, George (2021). From the Kur to the Aras: A Military History of Russia's Move into the South Caucasus and the First Russo-Iranian War, 1801–1813. Brill. ISBN 978-9004445154.
- Babayev, Elgun (2003). Из истории Гянджинского ханства [From the history of the Ganja Khanate] (PDF) (in Russian). Baku: Nurlan.
