= Palace of Ganja Khans =

Palace in the Ganja Khanate (c. 1800)

- Azerbaijani: Gəncə xanlarının sarayı
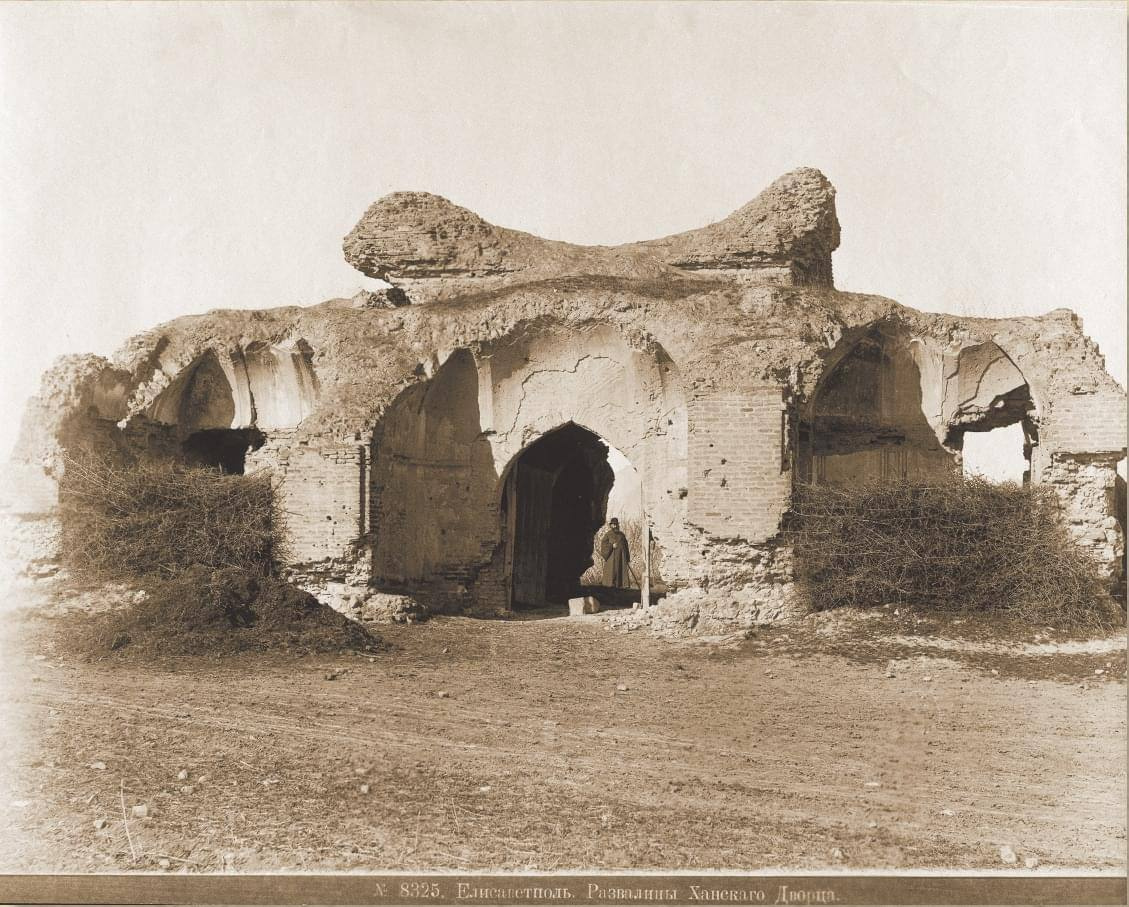
- Ruins of the palace of the Ganja Khans (ca. XIX)

- Location within Azerbaijan

General information
- Type: Palace
- Architectural style: Architecture of Azerbaijan
- Location: Ganja Khanate → Russian Empire
- Coordinates: 40.6789585°N 46.3574123°E
- Demolished: after Battle of Ganja

The Palace of Ganja Khans was the palace of Javad Khan, the last ruler of the Ganja khanate. The palace once located in the center of the city of Ganja, at west of Juma Mosque. The remaining ruins were demolished in 1974 and the Baku Cinema now occupies the palace site. Mausoleum of the last ruler of Ganja, Javad Khan was erected nearby.

== History ==
According to written sources, the palace of Javad Khan was built two centuries ago at current location of «Baku» cinema in Ganja. There were entrances to the underground roads of Ganja. Through these roads it was possible to get to the nearby Chorak-hamam and Juma-mosque (Shah-Abbas mosque).

In December 1803, on the eve of the assault on Ganja by Russian troops, the palace covered an area of about 233,8 square meters.

A photograph of the ruins of the Khan's palace is given in A. Salamzade, E. Avalov and R. Salayev's book "The Problems of Protection and Restoration of Historical Cities of Azerbaijan" (Baku, 1979).

== See also ==
Architecture of Azerbaijan
