= Isa Bulaghi =

- İsa bulağı
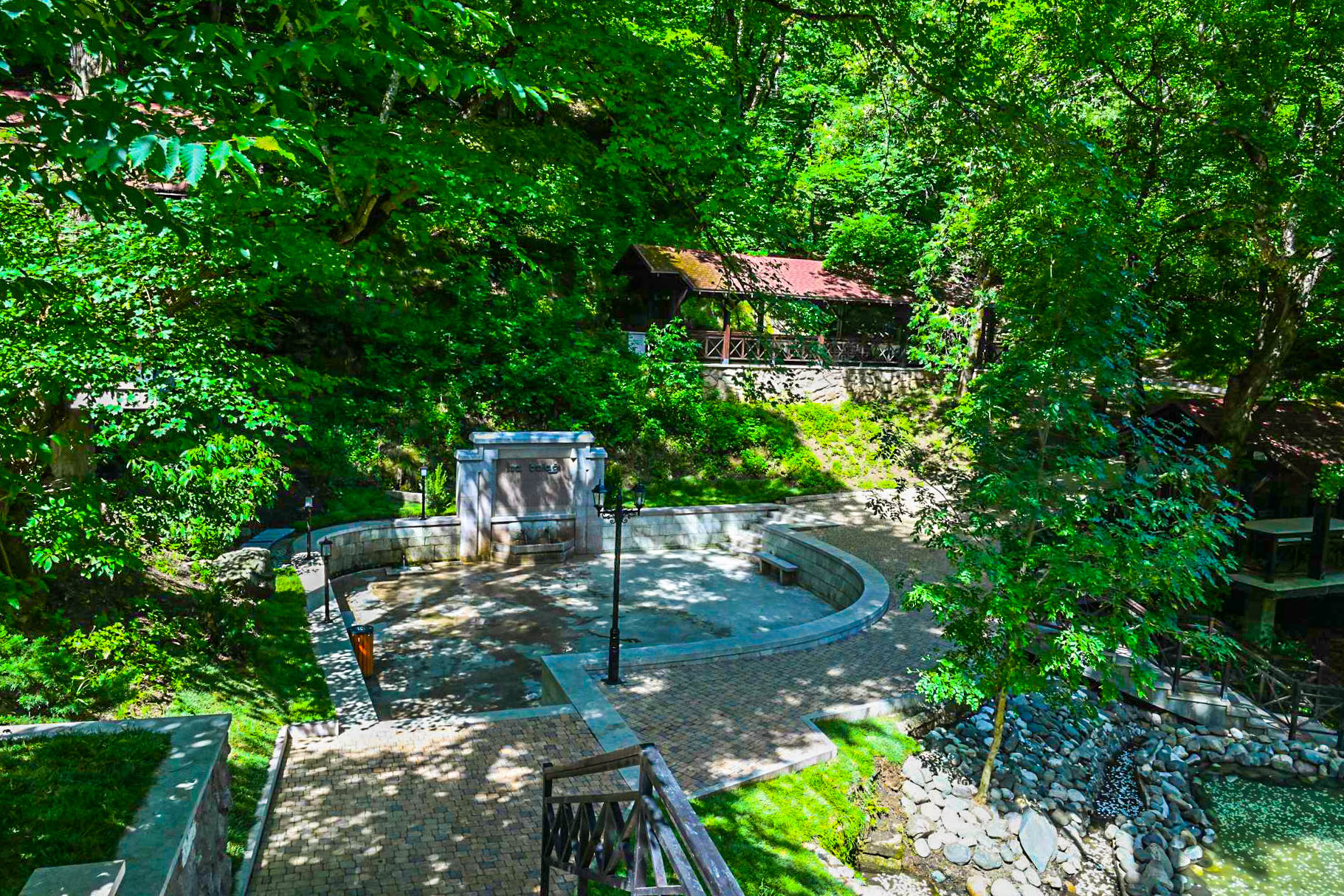
- Isa Bulaghi in July 2024, after restoration
- Interactive map of Isa Bulaghi
- Location: Shusha, Azerbaijan
- Coordinates: 39°44′41″N 46°42′35″E

Isa Bulaghi (Azerbaijani: İsa bulağı) is a spring in the city of Shusha, Azerbaijan. The spring is associated with the 19th century. After restoration works completed in the early 2020s, a recreation complex at the site was opened on 5 July 2024.

== History ==
In local tradition, the name of the spring has been explained in different ways; one version links it to a man named Isa, said to have discovered it in the forest in the 18th century.

In 1889, a water pipeline to Shusha was built from the Isa spring with funding associated in sources with the Azerbaijani poet Khurshidbanu Natavan.

During the Soviet period, Shusha developed as a resort and tourism center, with mineral springs described as part of this reputation; Isa Bulaghi is cited among such springs.

Following the restoration of Azerbaijani control over Shusha during the Second Karabakh War in 2020, restoration of the spring was announced and carried out in the early 2020s.

The spring structure was faced with marble, and the words "İsa bulağı" were rendered using a national ornament; the spring’s water supply was also restored. A recreation complex at the spring was opened on 5 July 2024.

== Gallery ==
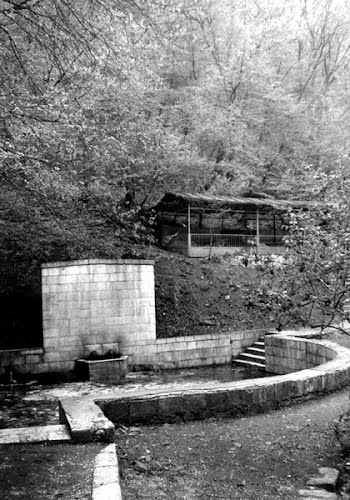
The spring in the Soviet period

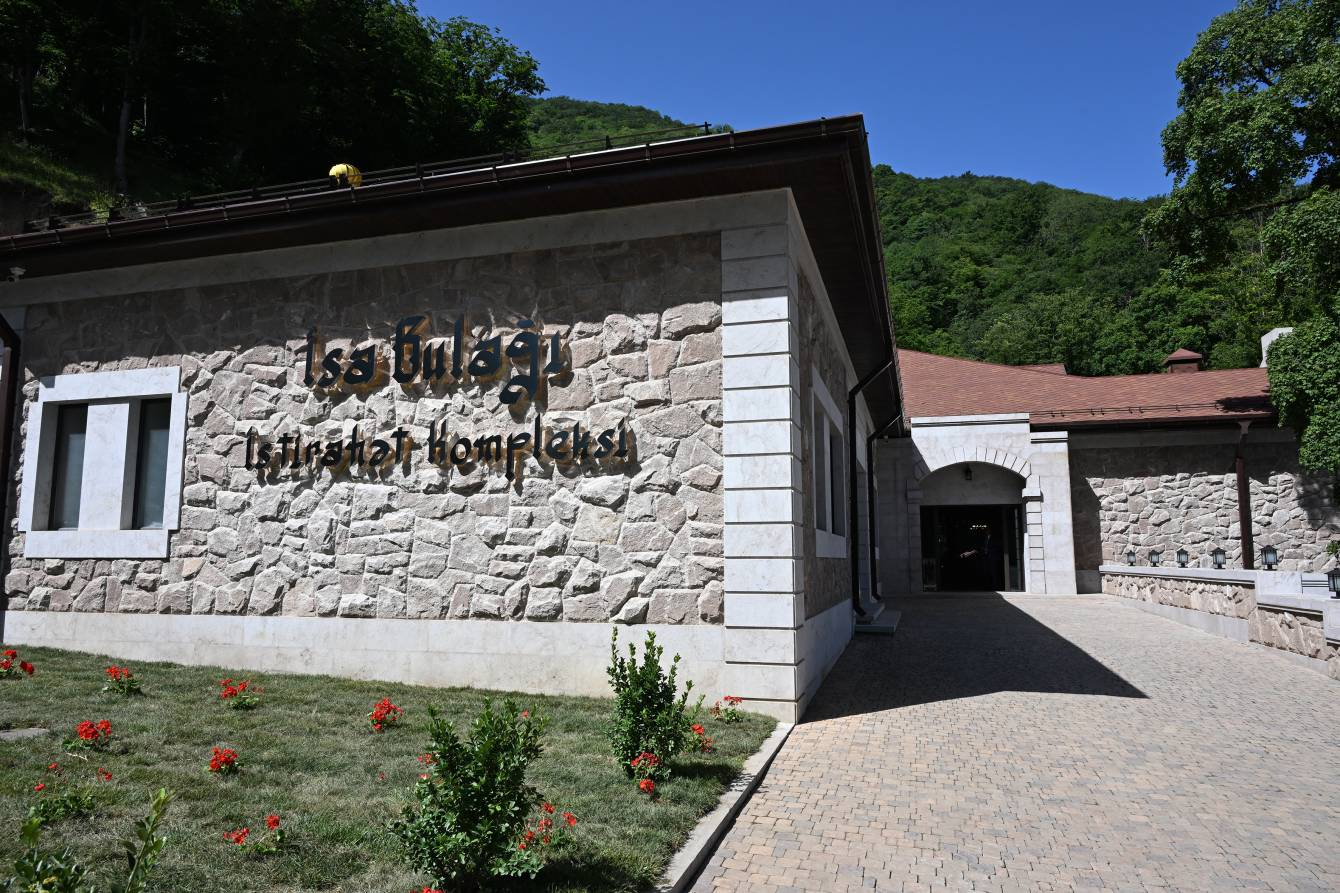
5 July 2024
