= Bust of Molla Panah Vagif =

- Azerbaijani: Molla Pənah Vaqifin büstü
- Location: Shusha, Azerbaijan
- Coordinates: 39.75956°N 46.75222°E
- Designer: Hayat Abdullayeva
- Material: bronze
- Opening date: 1957
- Restored date: 2021
- Dedicated to: Molla Panah Vagif

Bust of Molla Panah Vagif is a bust raised in the honour of the famous Azerbaijani poet, political and public figure of the 18th century, Molla Panah Vagif. It was destroyed after the capture of the city of Shusha in 1992 by the Armenian forces. It was renovated in 2021 after the city was liberated by the Azerbaijani armed forces in 2020.

== History ==
The bust of Molla Panah Vagif, made of bronze by the sculptor Hayat Abdullayeva in 1957, was raised as a tomb monument to the poet in Shusha near Jidir Duzu in 1958. Later, in 1976, the bust was moved closer to Vagif's house in Shusha. Before Vagif mausoleum's opening in 1982, the bust and the area around it were repaired, and the pedestal of the monument was replaced. Since the occupation of the city of Shusha by the Armenian forces in 1992, the bust, like many other monuments, was vandalized and destroyed.

After the city was captured by the Azerbaijani forces in 2020, the monument was restored in 2021 based on the original draft design of its author, Hayat Abdullayeva, being returned to its original place. On 29 August 2021, a new bust of Molla Panah Vagif was unveiled.

== Photographs ==
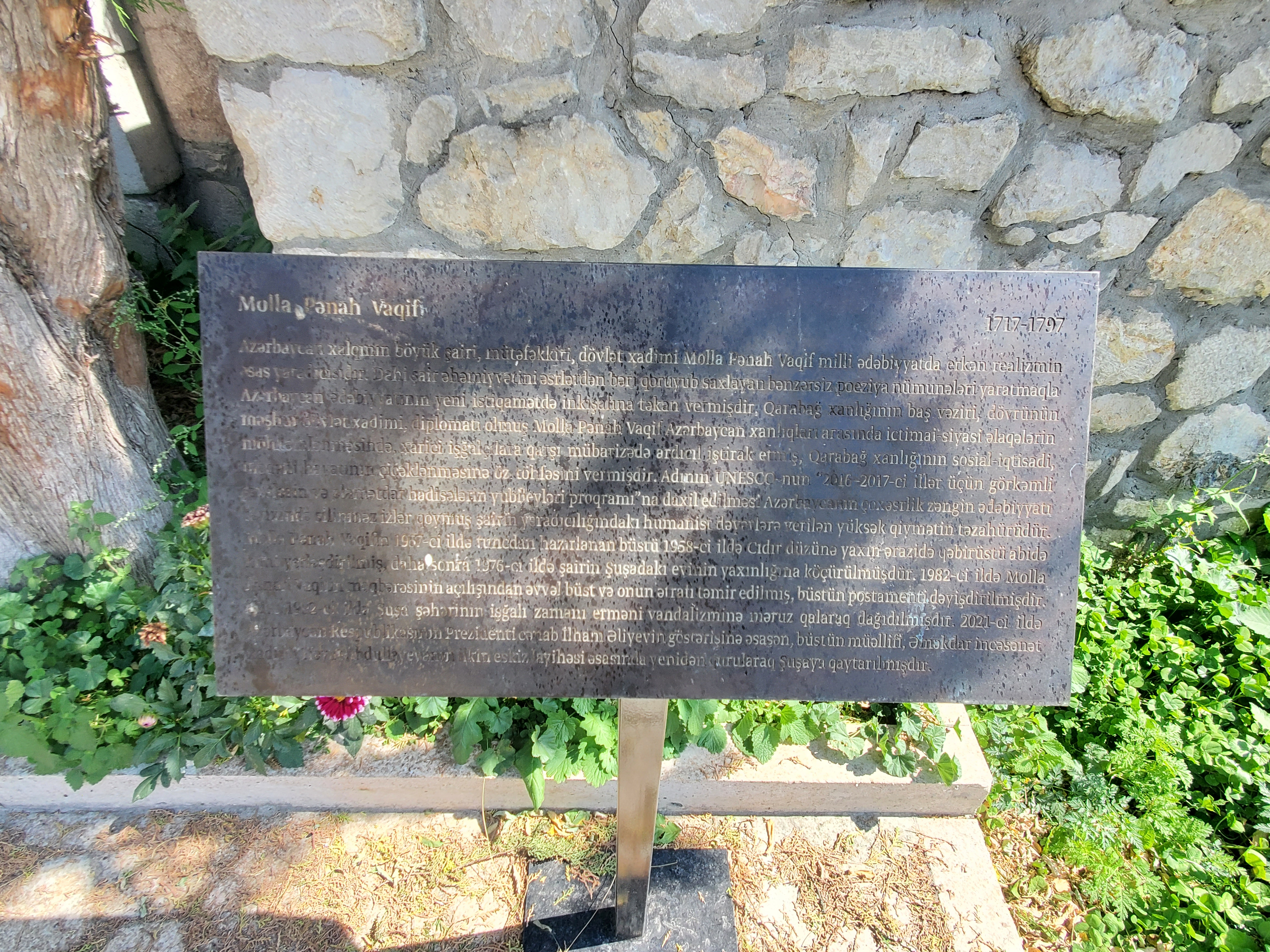

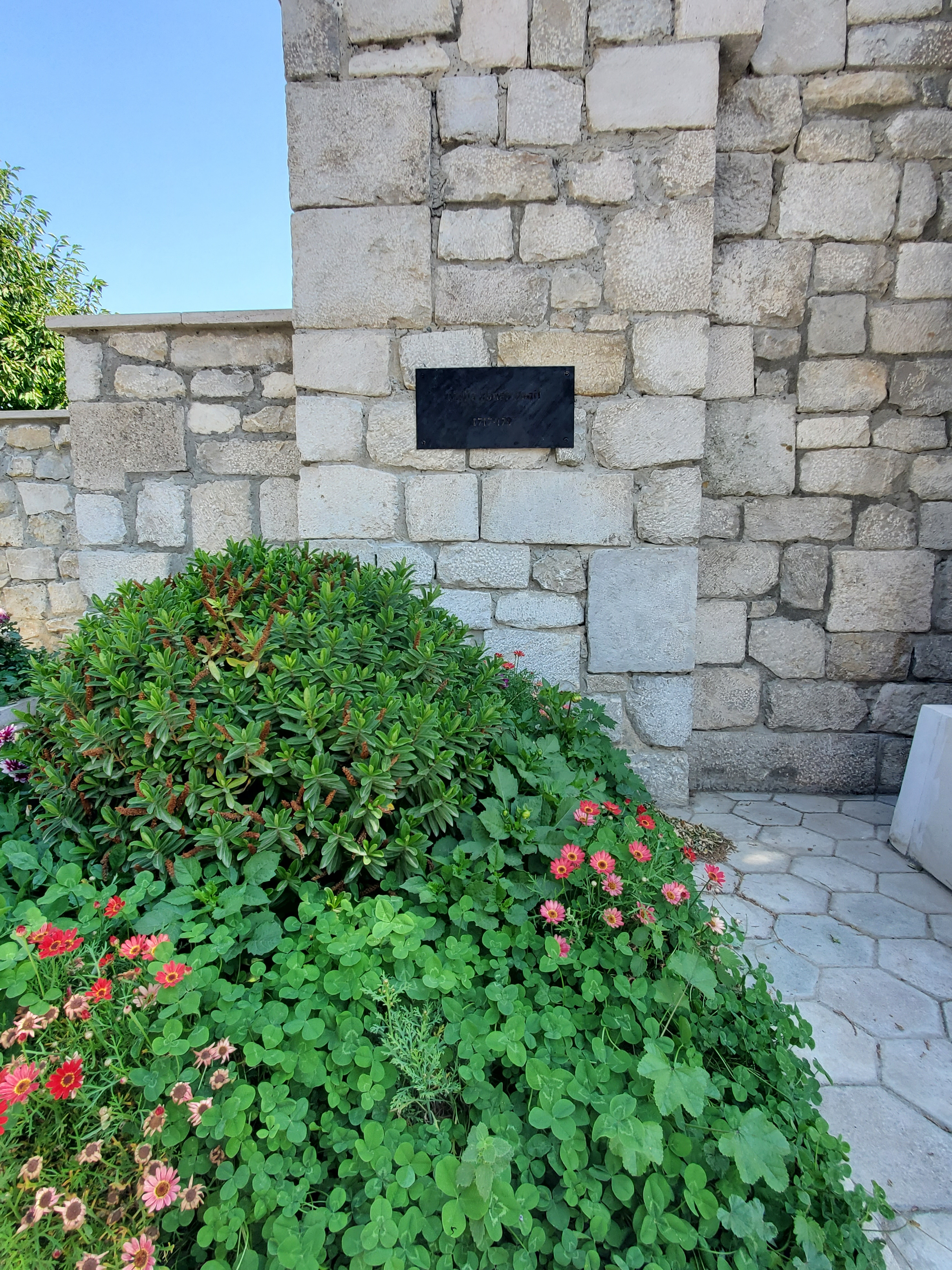

== See also ==
- Vagif Mausoleum
- Molla Panah Vagif
