= Khasay Khan Utsmiyev =

Russian general (1808–1867)

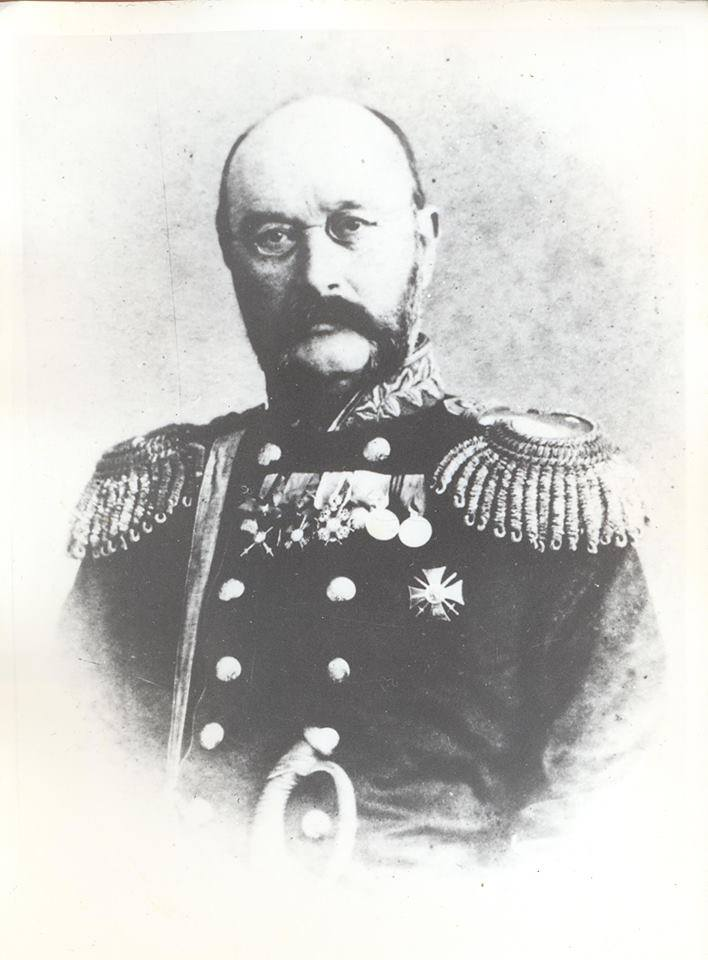
- Khasay Khan, c. 1865
- Born: 3 April 1808; Aqsay, Russian Empire
- Died: 3 May 1867 (aged 59); Voronezh, Voronezh Governorate, Russian Empire
- Spouse: Khurshidbanu Natavan
- Issue: Mehdigulu Khan Vafa

Khasay Khan Utsmiyev (Azerbaijani: Xasay xan Utsmiyev, Kumyk: Хасай-Хан Мусайны уланы) was an Imperial Russian general of Kumyk origin.

== Life and career ==
He was born on 3 April 1808, to Musa Khan Utsmiyev, ethnic Kumyk Prince of Aqsay as his middle son. He had an elder brother named Sultan Murad (d. 1841) and a younger brother Adil. His sister Tuti Bika Khanum was married to Ismayil bek Kutkashensky, the first Azerbaijani ever to be decorated with Order of St. George.

As a child, Utsmiev was taken to Tbilisi as a hostage. After completing his education at the Page Corps in Saint Petersburg, he began his military service in 1825 and served in the imperial Russian Army for the rest of his life. He started as a cadet in the 43rd Jaeger Regiment and was transferred to the Kherson Grenadier Regiment in 1833. He was commissioned as an officer on March 22, 1834. In 1836, Utsmiev joined the Life Guards Grenadier Regiment. He rose through the ranks, being promoted to second lieutenant and shtabs-kapitan in 1841, to major in the Separate Caucasian Corps in 1844, and to lieutenant colonel in 1845. On January 9, 1852, he was promoted to the rank of colonel.

This is when he was married to the Azerbaijani princess and poet Khurshidbanu Natavan. As a devout Sunni going to live among Shias, Khasay Khan also brought a Sunni mullah, Mullah Muhammad, who would become the grandfather of Uzeyir Hajibeyov as well. This marriage didn't please the relatives of the princess, including Gasim bey Zakir who strongly criticized her for marrying her lessers. His slightly blind right eye was often made fun of by Karabakh poets.

In 1857, he was appointed to serve in the Caucasian army for political purposes. He met with Alexander Dumas in 1858, who described him speaking French like a true Parisian, without an accent. He was also in contact with other Caucasian intellectuals such as Mirza Fatali Akhundov, Mirza Shafi Vazeh, Khachatur Abovyan and Gabriel Sundukyan in Tbilisi. He was friends with Decembrist exile Alexander Bestuzhev as well.

In 1861 he was sent to the command of the Commander of the troops in the Dagestan region, a year later he was promoted to major general on 30 August 1862.

== Dismissal and death ==
He was said to be offended by a discriminative comment and challenged the historian and one of the ideologists of Russian expansionism and chauvinism, General Rostislav Fadeev, to a duel. The reason for the duel was the words in Fadeev's book "Letters from Caucasus", where he insulted Islam and compared Caucasians to underdeveloped children who would not survive without the help of a “white man”. When he heard of Fadeev's writings from Irakli Gruzinsky, Khasay Khan called the general-historian for these words "rascal" but didn't shoot him. This caused huge insecurity issues for Utsmiyev and wrote to authorities to let him to move to Ottoman Empire with his family in 1866. Overseer for Terek Oblast, Mikhail Loris-Melikov however decided to summon him to Stavropol and expel him to Voronezh on 25 April 1866. At first, Utsmiyev attempted to kill himself, but was unsuccessful in his trial. He would die under mysterious circumstances on 3 May 1867 in Voronezh.

== Family ==
He was married three times:

1. Khurshidbanu Natavan
  1. Mehdigulu Khan Vafa
  2. Khanbike Khanum (1856–1921)
2. A noblewoman from Qaplanov clan
  1. Azamat Bike (b. 18 September 1859)
3. Pari Khanum Hamzayeva
  1. Reyhanat Bike (b. 12 July 1853)
  2. Sotikhan Bike (b. 5 July 1859)
  3. Musa Utsmiev (b. 4 August 1864)
  4. Sultan Murad Utsmiev (b. 23 November 1866)

== Awards ==
- Order of St. Stanislaus, 3rd degree (1836)
- Order of St. Anna, 3rd degree (1837)
- Order of St. Vladimir, 4th class with bow (1838)
- Gold saber with the inscription "For Bravery" (1841)

== In popular media ==
- Sübhün səfiri (2012) — portrayed by Zaur Shafiyev
- Paradise Under The Shade of Swords (1992) — portrayed by Vano Yantbelidze

== Gallery ==
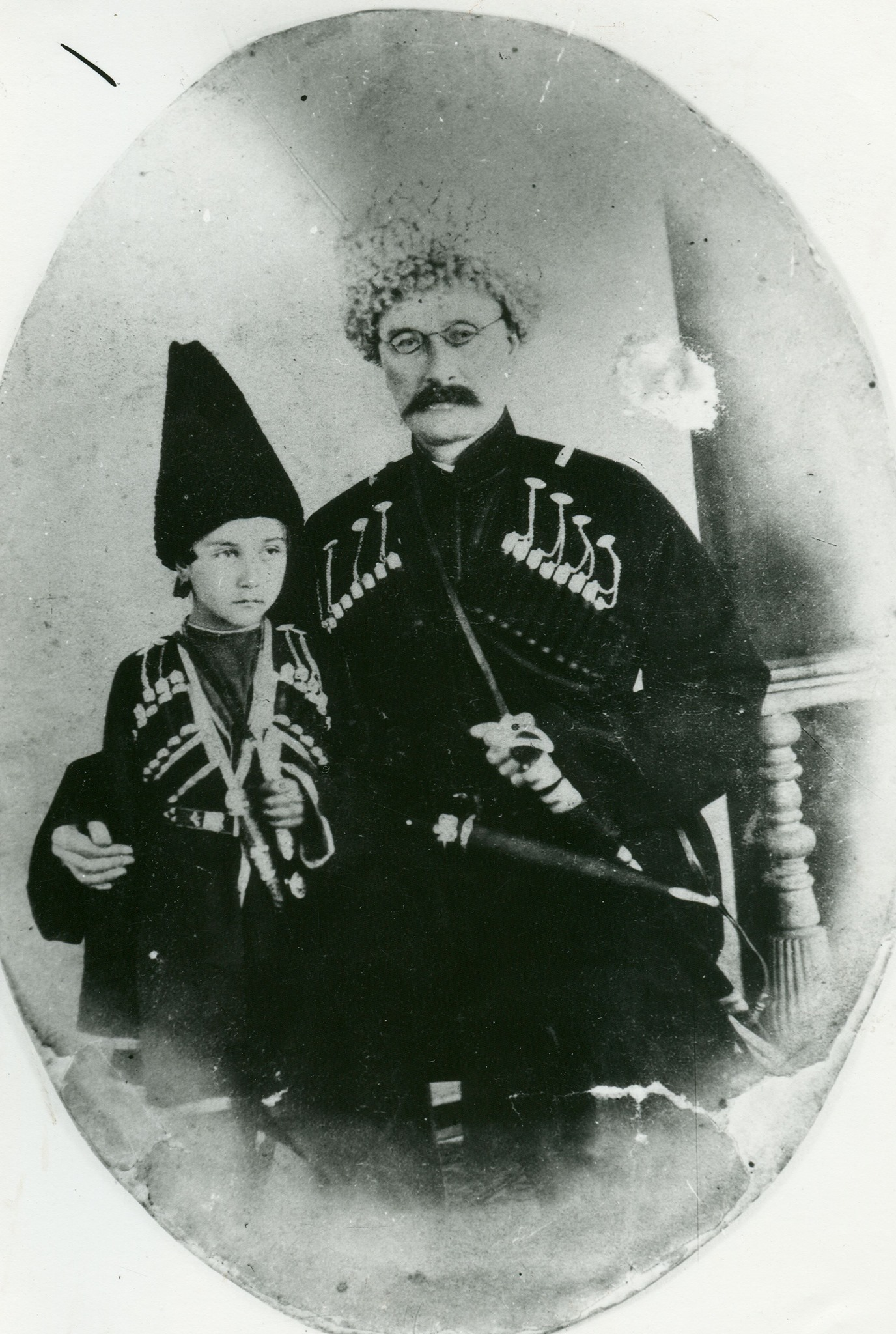
Khasay Khan with his son Mehdigulu Khan Vafa

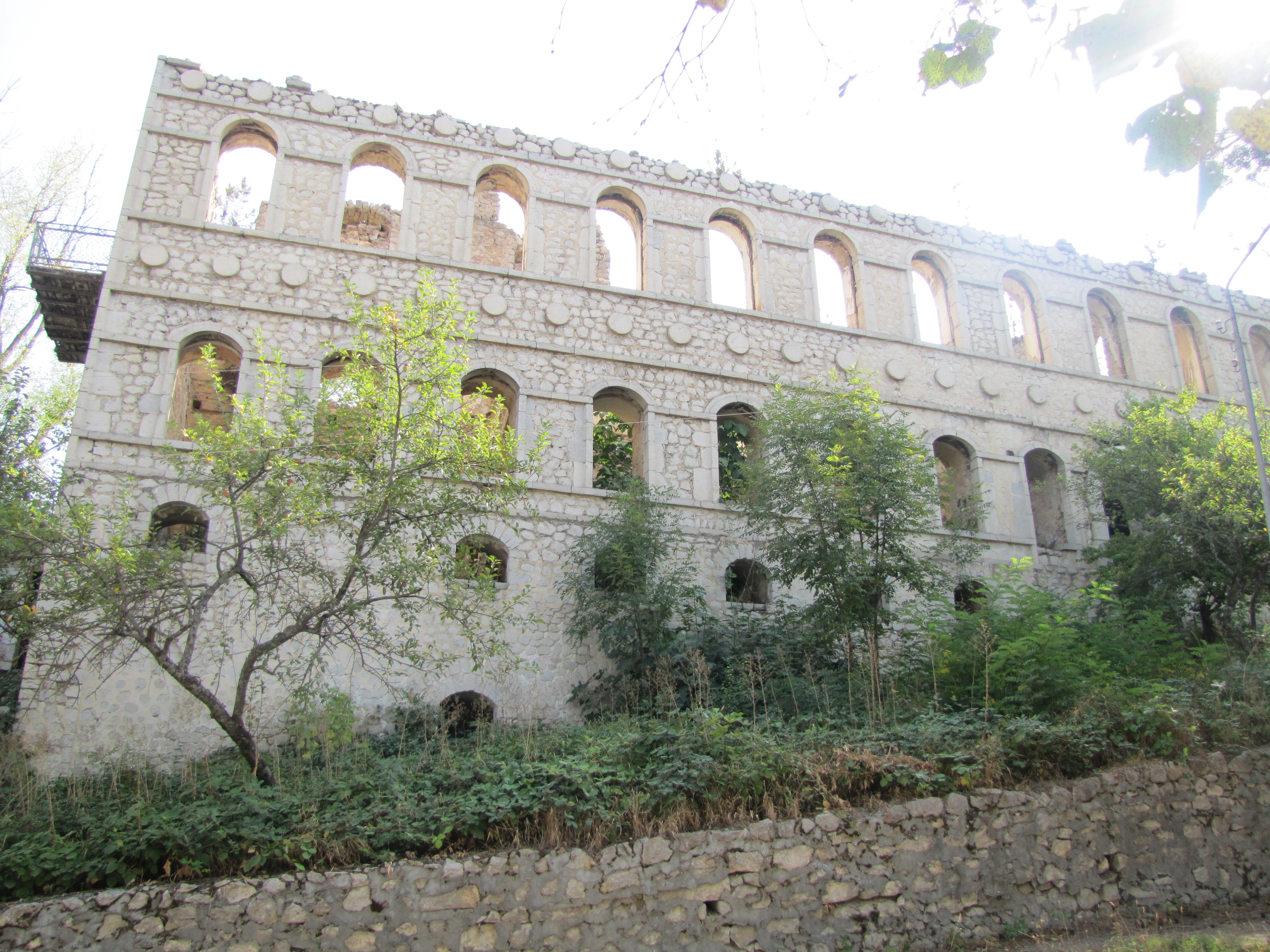
Utsmiev Palace in Shusha

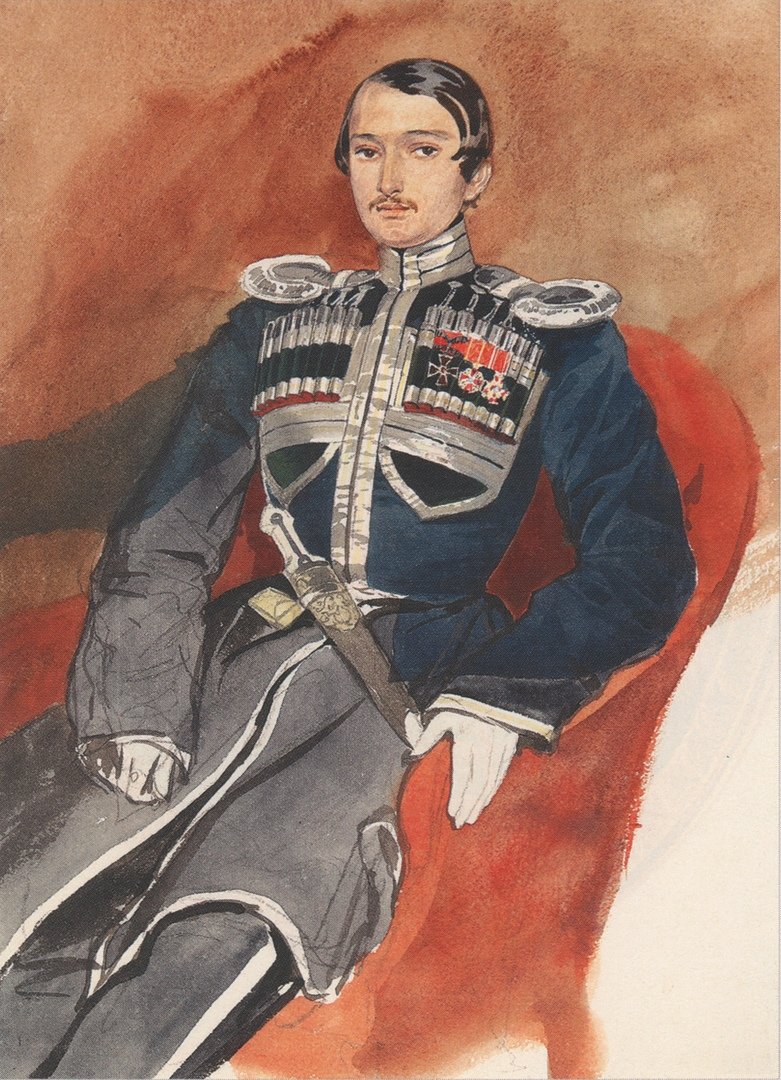
Portrait by Grigory Gagarin, 1840s

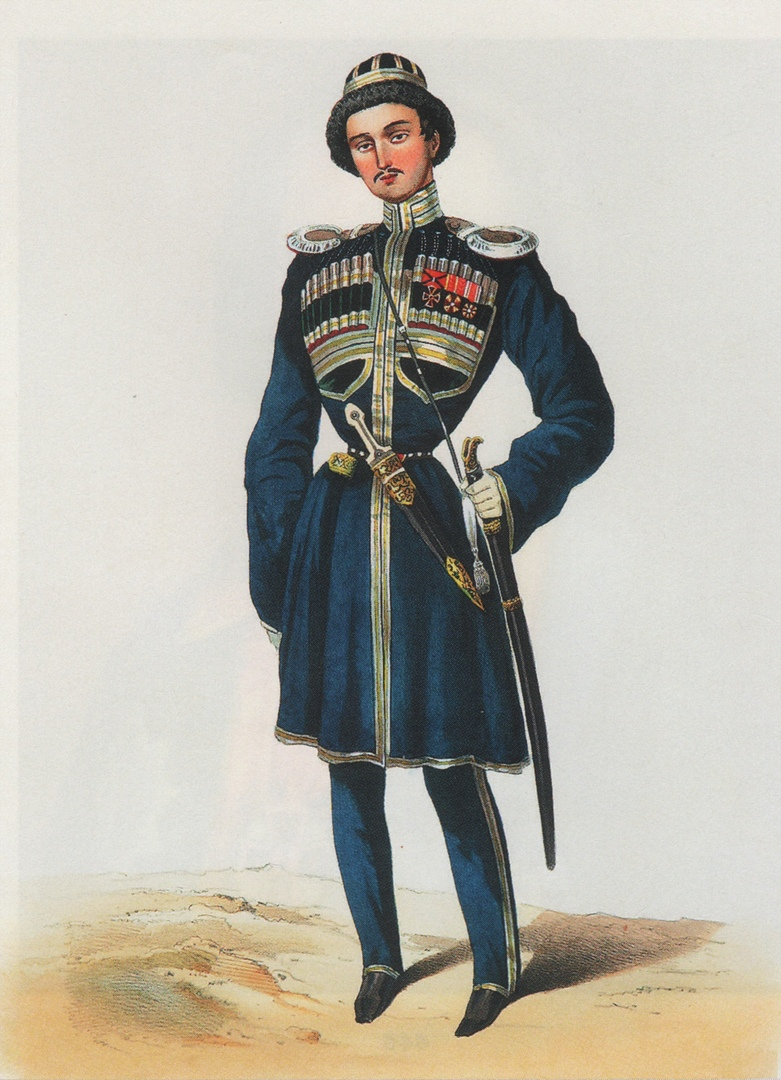
Portrait by Grigory Gagarin, 1844
