= Nushaba Asad Mammadli =

Azerbaijani writer, journalist, playwright and social worker

- Nüşabə Əsəd Məmmədli
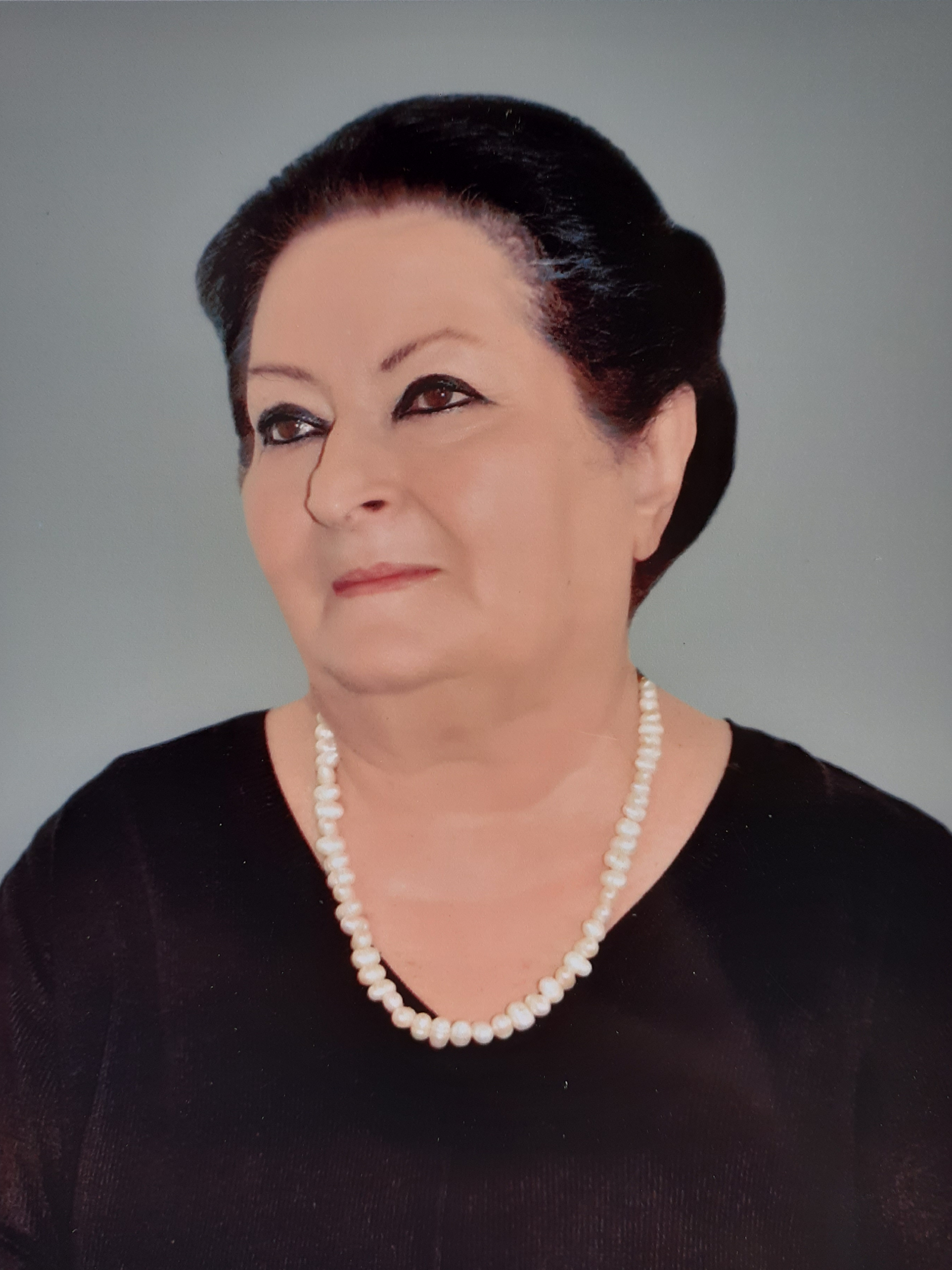
- Born: Nushaba Asad Mammadli; December 8, 1946 (age 79); Ganja, Azerbaijan SSR
- Occupations: writer, journalist

Nushaba Asad Mammadli (az. Nüşabə Əsəd Məmmədli) is an Azerbaijani writer, journalist, playwright and social worker. Her characters are commonly strong women who struggle in their lives. Some works have historical settings (“Javan khan”, “Solomon's reign”). Her novels and short stories are translated into Russian, English, Polish, Georgian, Ukrainian, Persian and Turkish. Mammadli is the founder of “Impressionizm” in Azeri literature.

== Early life and education ==
Nushaba Asad Mammadli was born in Ganja, Azerbaijan, 8 December 1946. From 1966 to 1972, she studied and graduated from Azerbaijan State University in journalism faculty.

== Career ==
In 1972, she worked for the newspaper, Kirovabad Worker, as a correspondent, department head, and deputy editor. In the period from 1990 to 1995, she worked as an editor of that newspaper. In February 1987, at the 7th congress of the Union of Journalists of Azerbaijan (UJA), Mammadli raised the question of returning the old name of Ganja to the city of Kirovabad, which at that time was criticized by the Soviet regime. In 1991, she first published in the Ganja public-literature magazine Motherland. In February 1992, immediately after the Khojaly tragedy, one of the few women's organizations in Ganja “Tomris” was founded by Mammadli, From 2003 to 2013, Mammadli served as editor of the independent and weekly newspaper Ganjabasar.

== Books ==
- “Leaf fall” (1984) - a storybook. Publishing House "Gənclik”
- “I want to forget” (1983) - a play. It was staged at the Ganja State Theater. (and also was included to the golden fund of national azeri television)
- “Mirage” (1987) a collection of novel and short stories. Gənclik Publishing House
- “The last song” (1991) a collection of novels, short stories and plays. Publishing House "Azərnəşr"
- “Javad Khan” - a play (1991) and a novel (1982–1992). (The play “Javad Khan” is included in the golden fund of Azerbaijani television) (The novel “Javad Khan” was first published in the Motherland magazine in 1996)
- “Scream” (1993) – a play. A film was shot based on the work.
- “Poppy field” (2004) - a collection of short stories and short stories. Publishing house "Adiloğlu".
- “The dance of white flowers” – a play. In 2007, based on this play, an art-television film was shot.
- “Farewell song” on January 20, 2012, the story dedicated to the events of January 20 was translated into Polish. The presentation was held at Warsaw State University.
- “Sunset” (2014) - a novel. Publishing House Əskəroğlu
- “Autumn tango” (2015) - a novel published in London

== Awards and honors ==
- “The Golden Feather” (1983)
- “The Publicist of the Year” (1989)
- “The Best Foreign Work” according to the Keihani Hawayi magazine (Iran)
- “Honored Journalist” (1991)
- Prize named after “Dilara Aliyeva” (1997)
- “Airport” Award (1997) for the best script on patriotism.
- “Zardabi” Award (2004)
