= Giyasly Mosque =

Former mosque in Qiyaslı, Agdam, Azerbaijan

- Azerbaijani: Qiyaslı Məscidi
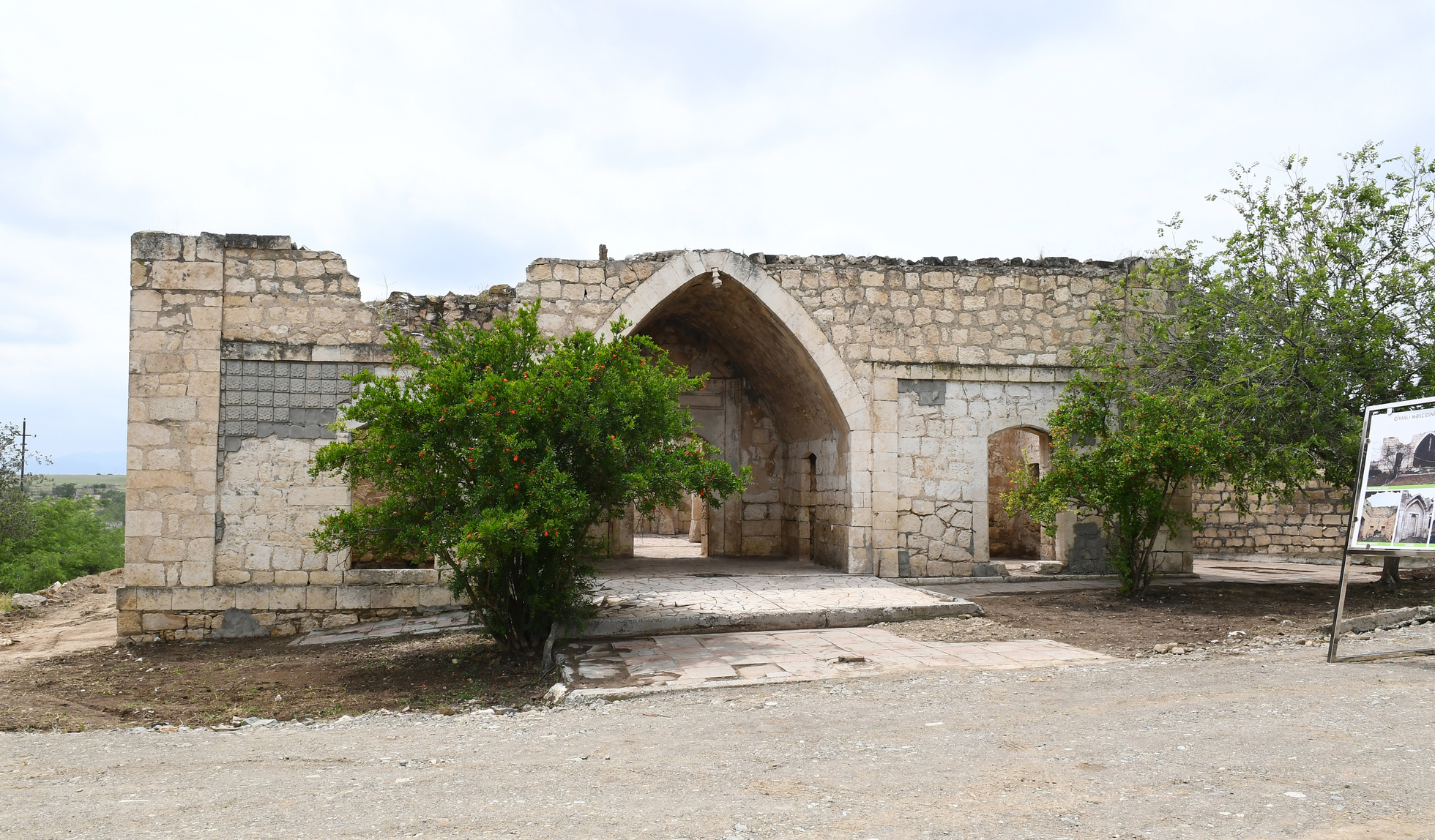
- Ruins of the mosque in 2021

- Location of the former mosque in Azerbaijan

Religion
- Affiliation: Islam (former)
- Ecclesiastical or organizational status: Mosque (18th century–1988); Profane use (1988–2020)
- Status: Abandoned (ruinous state)

Location
- Location: Qiyaslı, Aghdam District
- Country: Azerbaijan
- Interactive map of Giyasly Mosque
- Coordinates: 40°1′6″N 46°55′11″E

Architecture
- Type: Mosque architecture
- Completed: 18th century
- Minaret: Two (since destroyed)

The Giyasly Mosque (Azerbaijani: Qiyaslı Məscidi) is a former mosque located in the village of Qiyaslı, in the Aghdam District of Azerbaijan. By the order of the Cabinet of Ministers of the Republic of Azerbaijan dated with 2 August 2001, the mosque was taken under state protection as an architectural monument of local importance (No. 4052).

== History ==
The mosque was built in the 18th century.

In the early 1990s, during the First Nagorno-Karabakh War, the village of Giyasly was occupied by the Armenian armed forces. The mosque had two minarets, however the mosque was desecrated by the Armenians who set deliberate fires, resulting in severe damage to the mosque. A satellite study of the area revealed that Giyasly Mosque was turned into a barn between December 2011 and June 2014, during which time the exterior areas to the north of the mosque were shown to be cleared to contain animals. Following the Second Nagorno-Karabakh War, under the terms of the cessation agreement that took place on 20 November 2020, the village of Giyasly, as part of the Aghdam region, was returned to Azerbaijan.

The Kommersant correspondent Kirill Krivosheev, who visited the village in December 2020, noted that there were piles of hay in the village mosque, and a corral was made nearby.

== Gallery ==
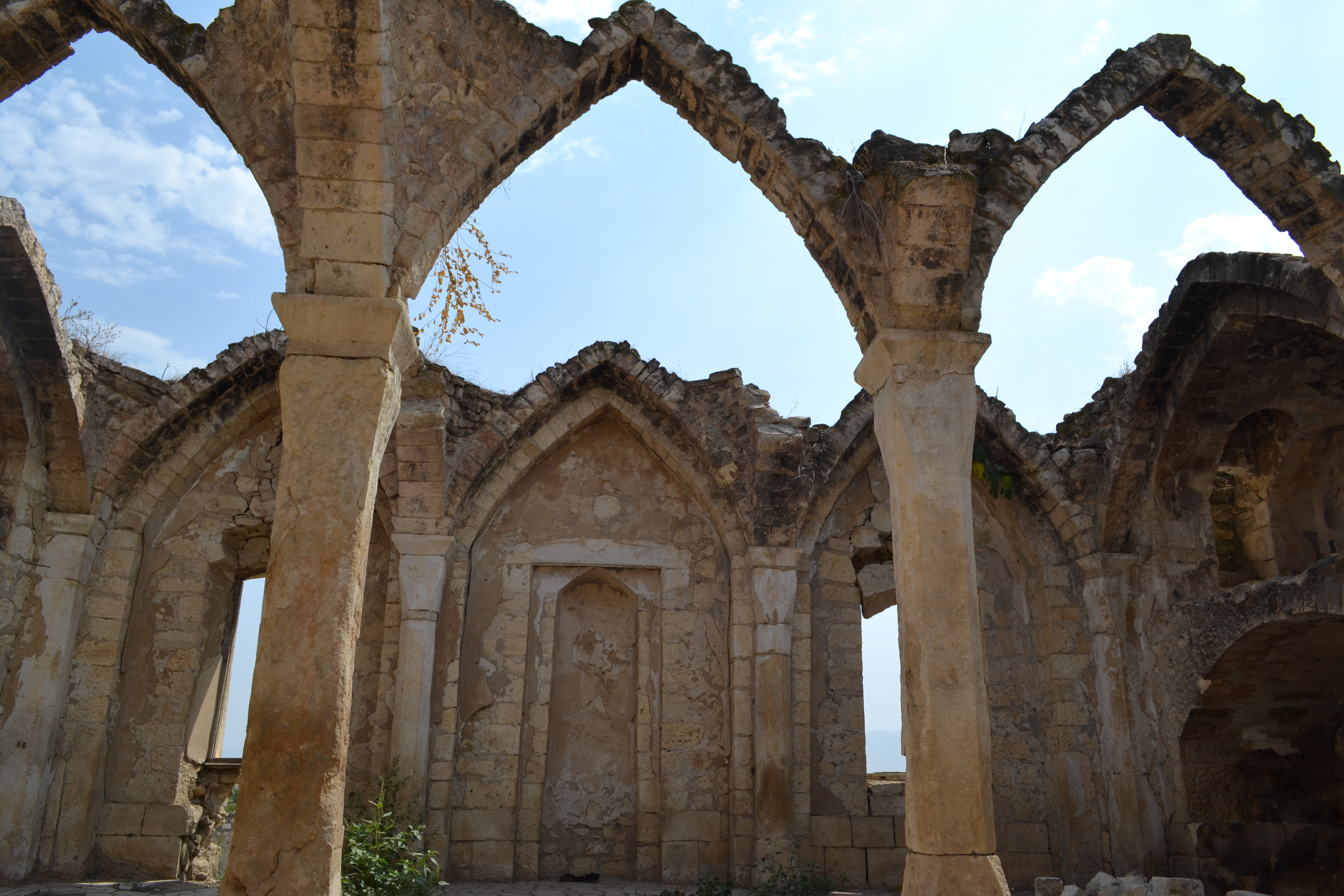

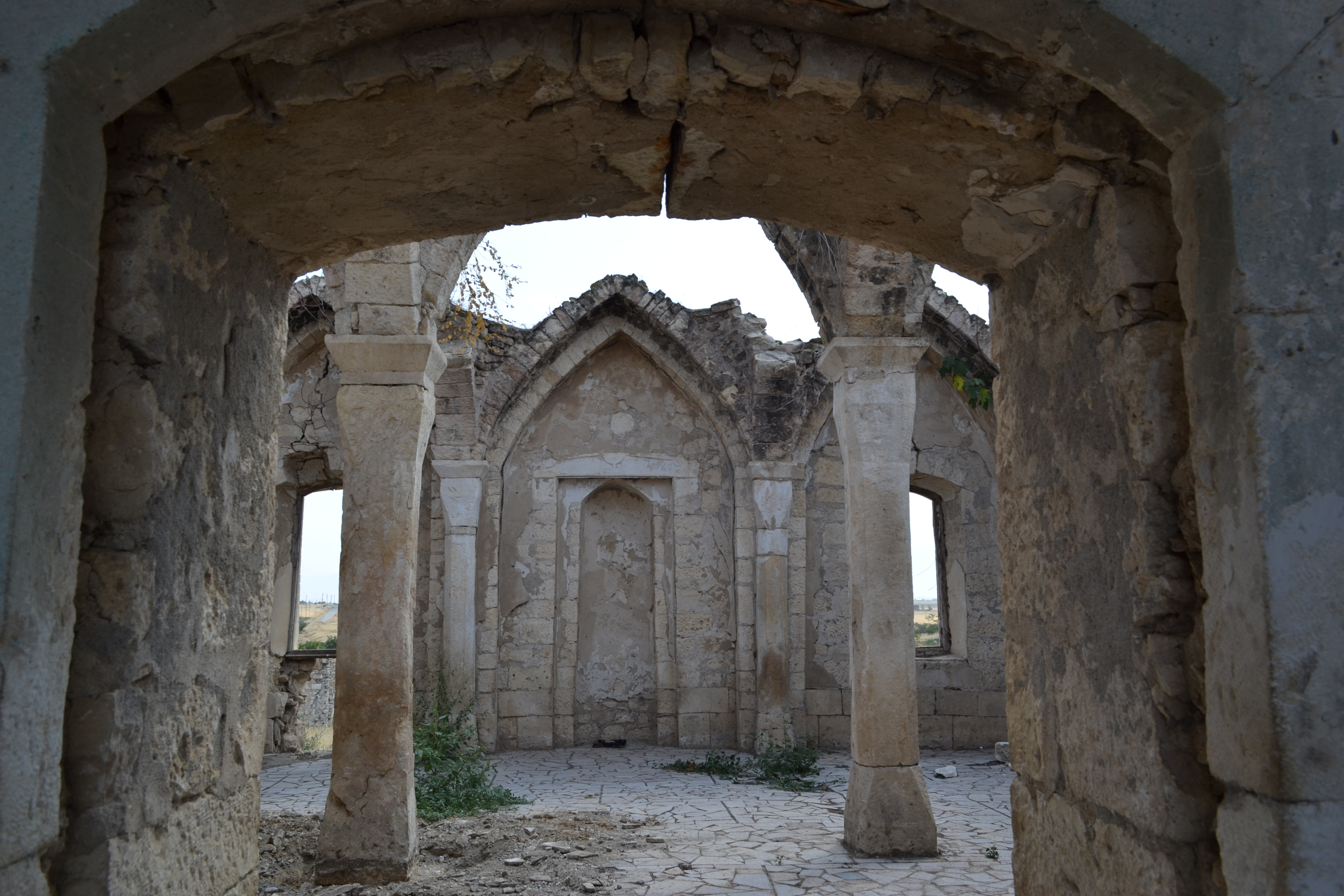

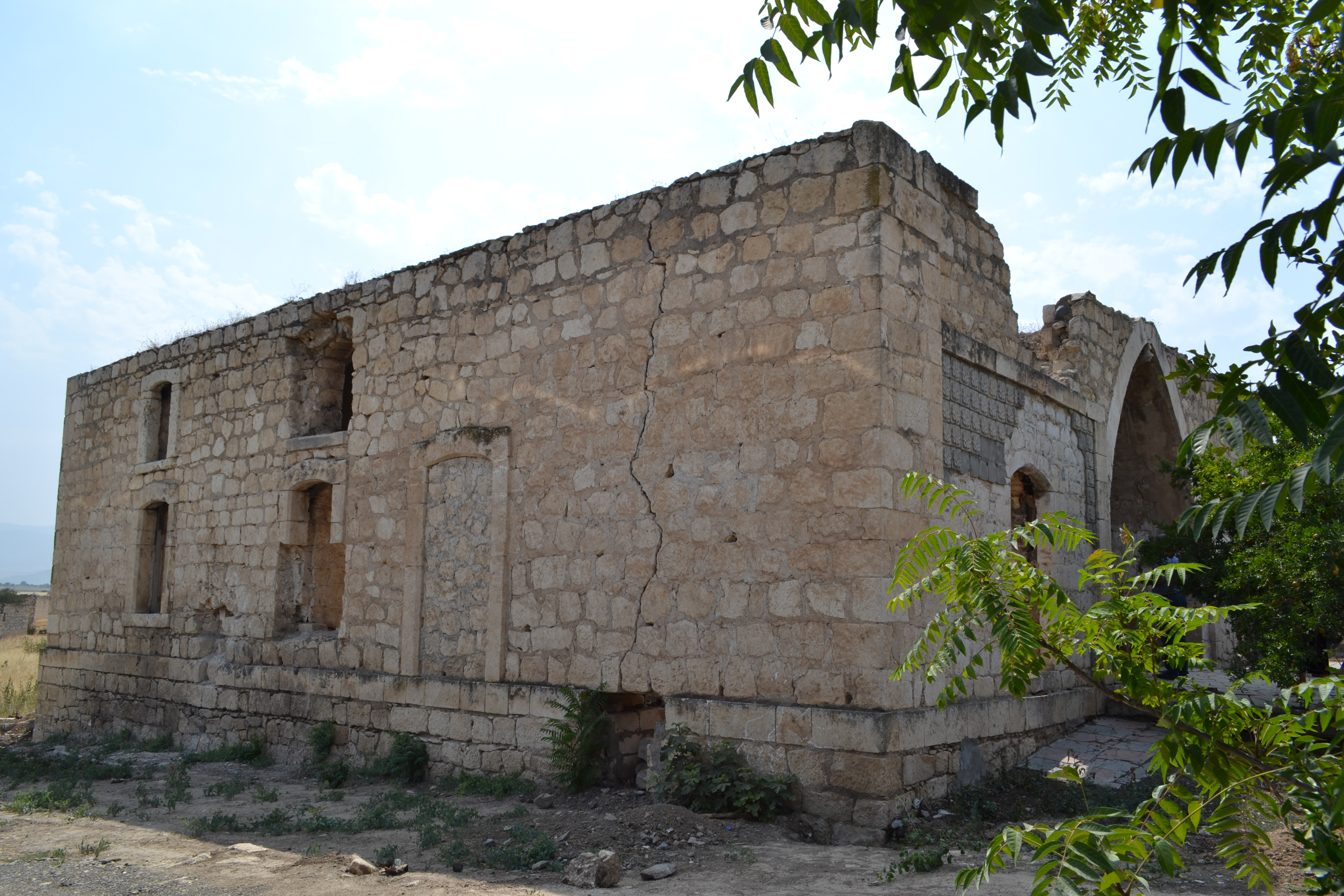

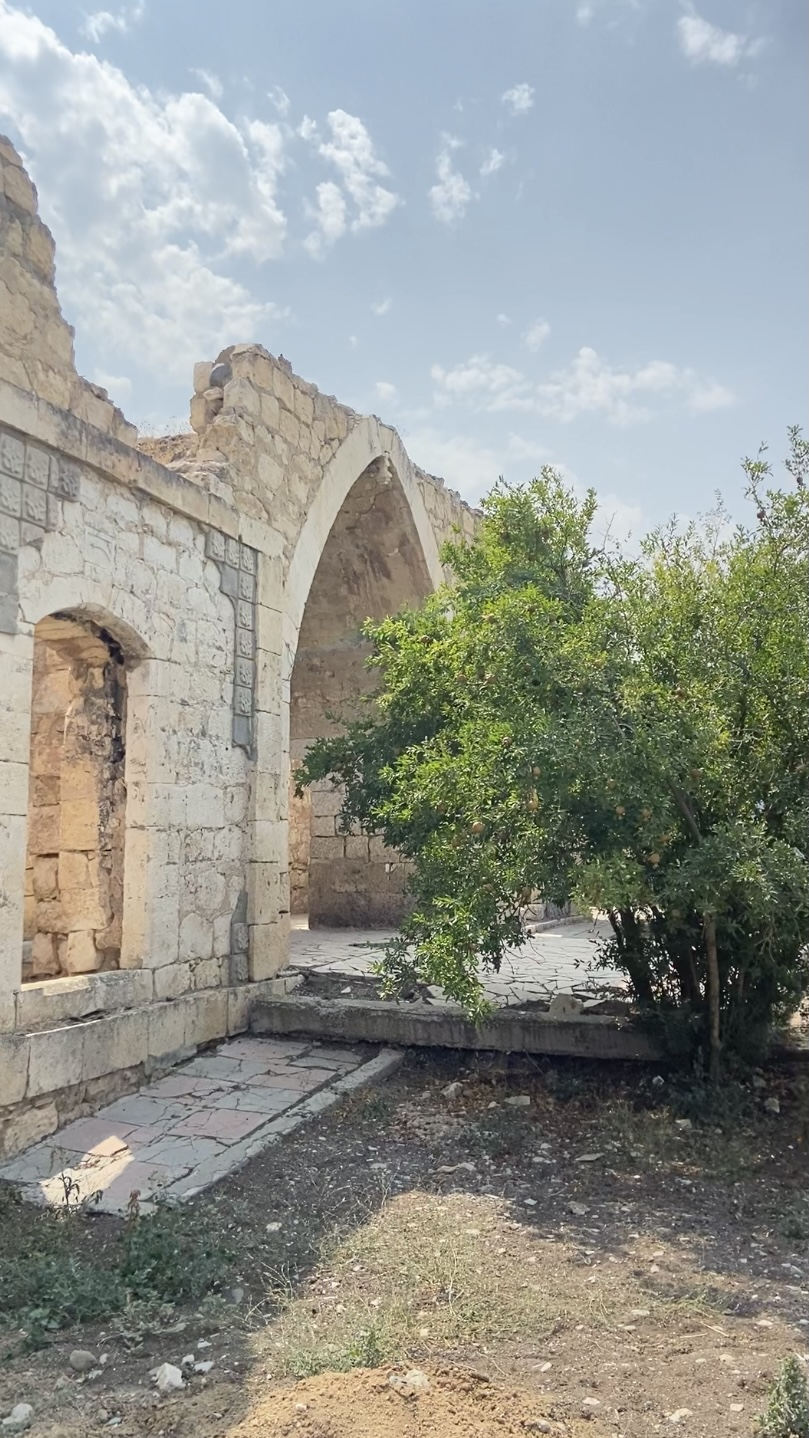

== See also ==
- Islam in Azerbaijan
- List of mosques in Azerbaijan
