= Tomb of Javad Khan =

Rebuilt tomb in Ganja, Azerbaijan

- Cavad xan türbəsi (Azerbaijani)
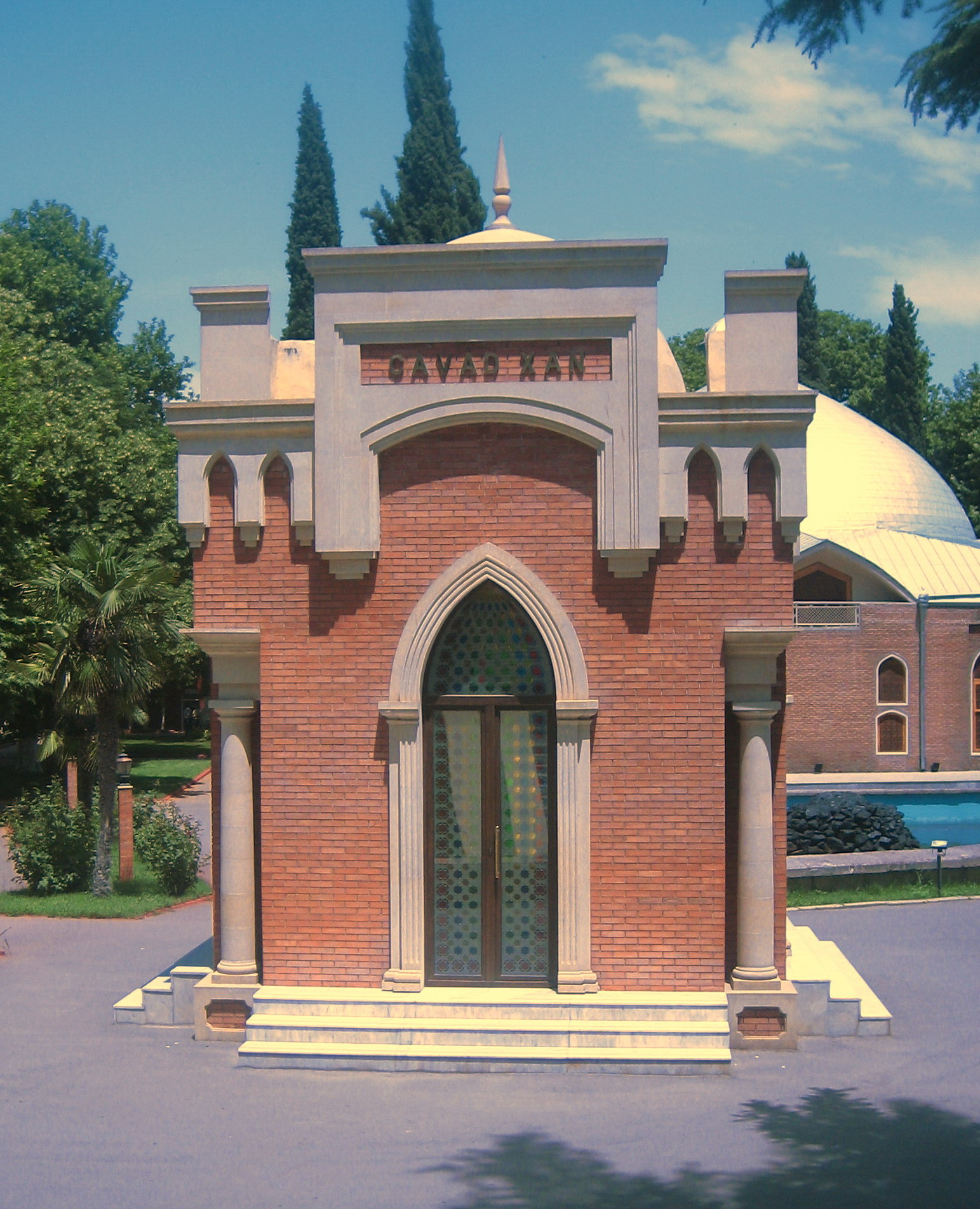

- Location within Azerbaijan
- 40°40′38″N 46°21′29″E
- Location: Ganja, Azerbaijan

History
- Built: 2005

Site notes
- Architect: Mammad Ibrahimov
- Architectural style: Arran architectural school

Javad Khan's tomb is in Ganja, Shah Abbas Square, near the Shah Abbas Mosque.

== History ==
At the time of the USSR, during excavations, the excavator was accidentally involved in the construction of a fountain in the courtyard of the mosque, and excavations were stopped. The grave and gravestone which something had been written on them in Arabic were found. The reading of the articles shows that the grave belongs to the martyr khan of Ganja- Javad Khan and the graveyard is restored regardless of the protests and obstacles of the center.

Finally, in 2005, thanks to the support of the Heydar Aliyev Foundation, the tomb is being erected on the grave, and the memory of Javad Khan is perpetuated. The mausoleum is constructed in a quadrangular form from the baked bricks in accordance with the style of the Arran architectural school and covered with a dome. The grave of Javad Khan lies in the center of the tomb.

The main stone is kept in Ganja Historical Museum of Ethnography as a valuable exhibit.
