= Qaraqoyunlu, Shamkir =

Coordinates: 40.712°N 45.971°E

Qaraqoyunlu is a village and municipality in the Shamkir Rayon of Azerbaijan. It has a population of 123.
