= Qaraqoyunlu, Goranboy =

Qaraqoyunlu
- Location within Azerbaijan
- Coordinates: 40°39′06″N 46°49′49″E
- Country: Azerbaijan
- Rayon: Goranboy
- Time zone: UTC+4 (AZT)
  - Summer (DST): UTC+5 (AZT)

Qaraqoyunlu (also, Karakoyunlu and Karakoyunly) is a village in the Goranboy Rayon of Azerbaijan.
