= Biləyən =

Coordinates: 40°03′N 47°09′E

Biləyən (also, Bilağan) is a village and municipality in the Aghjabadi Rayon of Azerbaijan. It has a population of 697.
