= Bust of Khurshidbanu Natavan =

Sculpture by Hayat Abdullayeva

- Xurşidbanu Natəvanın büstü (Azerbaijani)
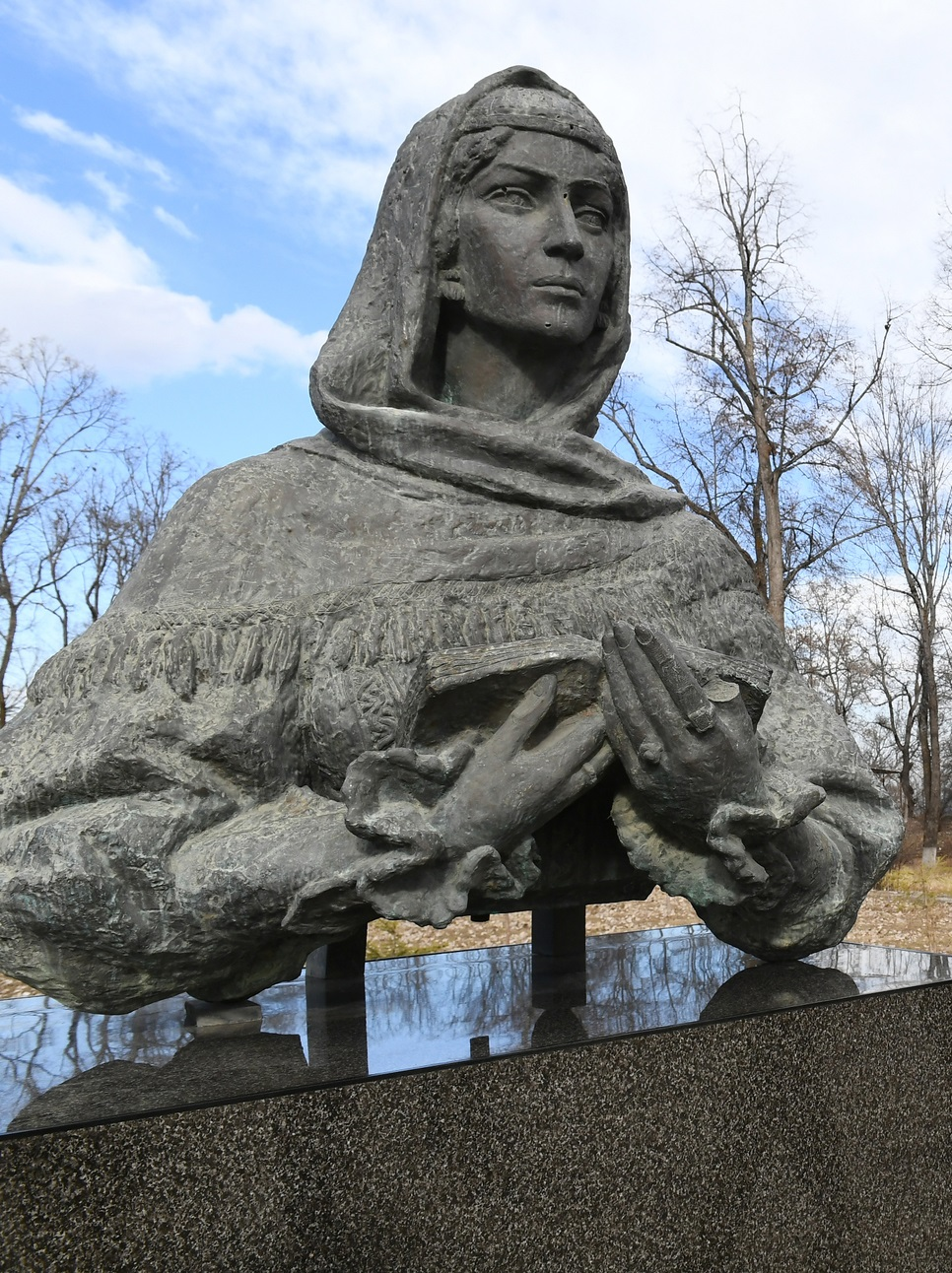
- The bust in January 2021
- Artist: Hayat Abdullayeva
- Year: 1982
- Type: Sculpture
- Medium: Bronze
- Subject: Khurshidbanu Natavan
- Location: Shusha
- Owner: Shusha City Executive Power

The Bust of Khurshidbanu Natavan (Azerbaijani: Xurşidbanu Natəvanın büstü), also known as the Monument of Natavan, Daughter of the Khan (Azerbaijani: Xan qızı Natəvanın abidəsi), is a public bronze bust of Khurshidbanu Natavan displayed in Shusha, Azerbaijan. The bust, made by the Azerbaijani sculptor Hayat Abdullayeva and unveiled in 1982, was heavily damaged by the Armenian forces when they captured Shusha in 1992, during the First Nagorno-Karabakh War, and was transferred to Armenia. It was then bought by the Azerbaijani authorities in Georgia, and transferred to Azerbaijan, to be displayed in the yard of the Azerbaijani National Museum of Art in Baku. In 2020, the Azerbaijani forces recaptured Shusha, and the bust was returned to the city in January 2021.

== History ==
The bronze bust was made by the Azerbaijani sculptor Hayat Abdullayeva, and was unveiled in 1982, in Shusha, Azerbaijani SSR, which was then part of the Soviet Union. It depicts Khurshidbanu Natavan, a 19th-century Azerbaijani poet.

On 8 May 1992, during the First Nagorno-Karabakh War, the Armenian forces captured Shusha, and its Azerbaijani population of about 15,000 people, was forced to flee. Most of the city came into ruins, with the city turning into a ghost town. The Armenian forces heavily damaged the bust, with bullet marks being visible throughout the sculpture. It was transferred to Armenia, and then were purchased by the Azerbaijani authorities in Tbilisi, Georgia. The bust was transferred to Baku, the capital of Azerbaijan, and was kept in the courtyard of the headquarters of the Red Cross until being moved to the yard of the Azerbaijani National Museum of Art in Baku.

The British journalist Thomas de Waal, who saw the monuments in Baku, wrote:

After capturing the city, the Armenians in revenge dismantled and sold bronze busts of three Azerbaijani musicians and poets, natives of Shusha, and these relics were miraculously saved, this time thanks to a scrap metal buyer in Tbilisi. I saw these three bronze busts–in a deplorable state, with traces of bullets, they were lying in the courtyard of the headquarters of the Red Cross in Baku. The poetess Natevan with a head covered with a scarf, holding a book in her hand with a broken thumb; the composer Hajibeyov, speckled with bullets, in a double-breasted jacket and broken glasses, and the famous singer Bulbul, who looks like a thinker ... with a bulging bronze forehead."

Azerbaijan recaptured Shusha after a three-day long battle on 8 November 2020, during the Second Nagorno-Karabakh War. On 15 January, the President of Azerbaijan, Ilham Aliyev, and the First-Vice President Mehriban Aliyeva visited Shusha, and the bust was returned to the city the next day.

== Sources ==
- Durch, William J. (1996). UN Peacekeeping, American Politics, and the Uncivil Wars of the 1990s. New York: Palgrave Macmillan. ISBN 0-312-12930-0.
- Goble, Paul (12 November 2020). "Shusha Once Again Key to War and Peace Between Armenia and Azerbaijan". Eurasia Daily Monitor. 17 (160). Jamestown Foundation.
- de Waal, Thomas (2003). Black Garden: Armenia and Azerbaijan through Peace and War. New-York: New-York University Press. ISBN 0-8147-1945-7.
