= Qiyaslı, Agdam =

Qiyaslı
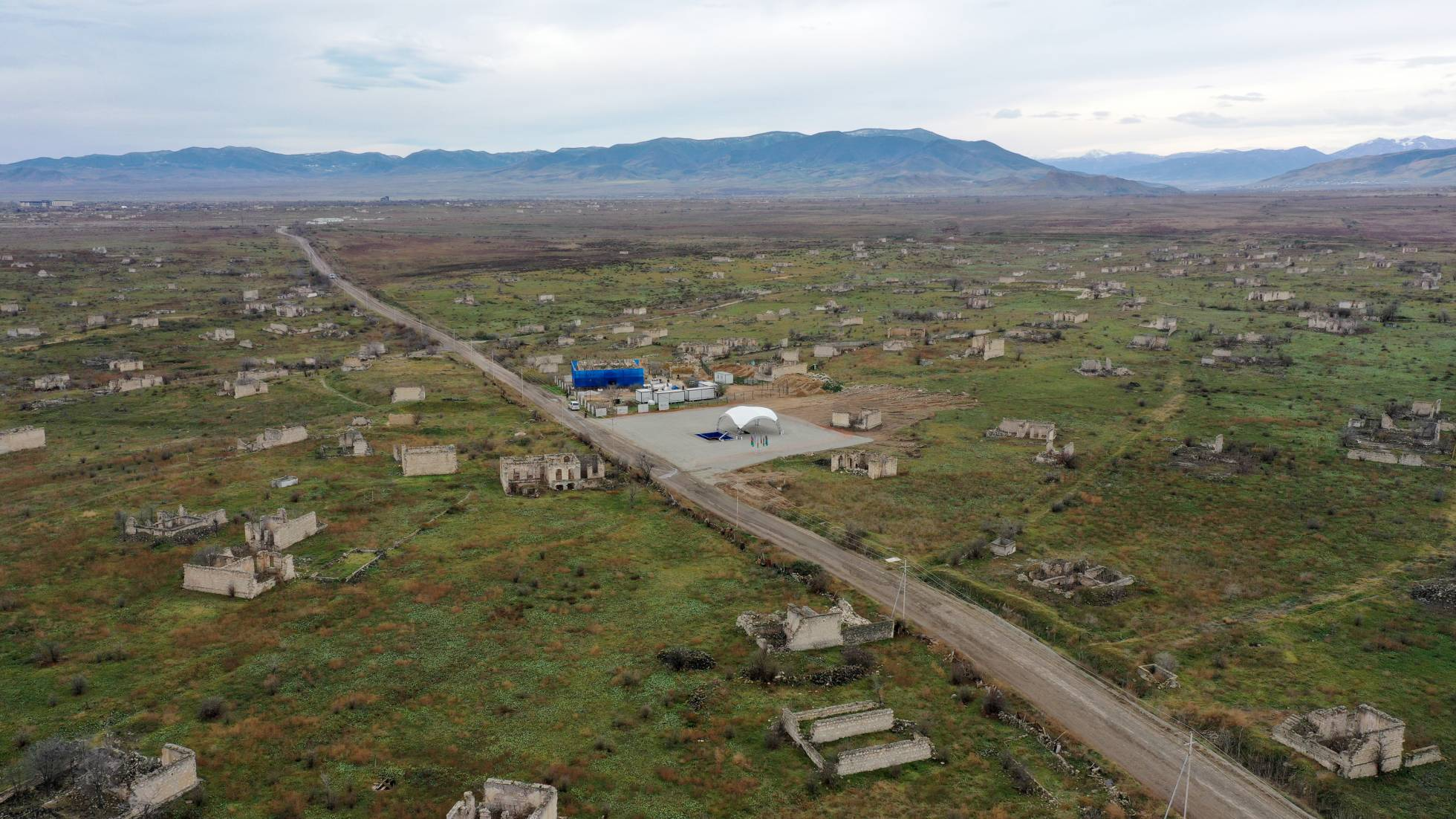

- Location within Azerbaijan Location within Karabakh Economic Region
- Coordinates: 40°01′35″N 46°54′55″E
- Country: Azerbaijan
- Rayon: Agdam
- Time zone: UTC+4 (AZT)
  - Summer (DST): UTC+5 (AZT)

Qiyaslı (also, Kiyasly) is a village in the Agdam Rayon of Azerbaijan.

== Religion ==
- Giyasly village Mosque
