= Qaraqoyunlu, Qubadli =

Qaraqoyunlu
- Location within Azerbaijan
- Coordinates: 39°10′42″N 46°41′12″E
- Country: Azerbaijan
- Rayon: Qubadli
- Time zone: UTC+4 (AZT)
  - Summer (DST): UTC+5 (AZT)

Qaraqoyunlu (also, Karakoyumlu, Karakoyunlu, and Kara-Koyunly) is a village in the Qubadli Rayon of Azerbaijan.

By the Resolution of the Supreme Soviet of the Republic of Azerbaijan dated May 25, 1991, No. 123-XII, the village of Garagoyunlu was transferred from the Khojahan village Soviet of the Qubadli district to the Tatar village Soviet. In 1993, it was occupied by the Armed Forces of Armenia. It was liberated from occupation by the Armed Forces of the Republic of Azerbaijan on November 9, 2020
