= Qaraqoyunlu, Agsu =

Qaraqoyunlu
- Municipality
- Location within Azerbaijan
- Coordinates: 40°32′44″N 48°18′08″E
- Country: Azerbaijan
- Rayon: Agsu

Population
  - Total: 1,373
- Time zone: UTC+4 (AZT)
  - Summer (DST): UTC+5 (AZT)

Qaraqoyunlu (also, Karakoyunlu, Karakoyunly, and Qaraqoynlu) is a village and municipality in the Agsu Rayon of Azerbaijan. It has a population of 1,373.
