= Sabina Shikhlinskaya =

Azerbaijani artist (born 1962)

- Born: Sabina Shikhlinskaya; April 26, 1962 (age 63); Baku, Azerbaijan
- Known for: visual art
- Movement: Conceptual art

Sabina Shikhlinskaya (Azerbaijani: Səbinə Şixlinskaya), born April 26, 1962, in Baku, is an Azerbaijani artist and state-funded curator. She works in painting, video, and photography.

== Life and career ==
Sabina Shikhlinskaya was born April 26, 1962, in Baku, Azerbaijan, where she lives and works. She has been a member of the Azerbaijan Artists Union since 1988, has a title of Honored Artist of the Azerbaijan Republic, a member of CIMAM / International Committee for Museums and Collections of Modern Art since 2009. Educated in Vera Mukhina Institute of Arts, St. Petersburg, Russia (1981–1983), in Azerbaijan State University of Culture and Arts (1983–1988). In 1983 she started to participate in art exhibitions in Azerbaijan and abroad. In 1996, under the leadership of Shikhlinskaya the independent Art Group "Labyrinth" was founded. In the period 1999–2005, with the participation of the "Labyrinth" group, she started a number of land art projects in Azerbaijan.

Since 1993, Sabina Shikhlinskaya has curated more than 50 exhibitions and projects in both Azerbaijani and international venues. Beginning in 2006, she began to participate in art residencies and forums all over the world, being intensively involved in the development of the "art mobility" international movement.

== Art work ==
Sabina Shikhlinskaya, from 1977 to 1981, studied painting at the Azimzadeh State College of Fine Arts in Baku. After graduating, she enrolled in the Mukhina Institute of Fine Arts in St. Petersburg, where she continued her studies of monumental (large format) painting. However, Shikhlinskaya abandoned her diploma work in 1983 due to her disagreement with the normative and propagandistic Soviet style, returning to Baku to study easel painting at the Azerbaijan State University of Arts. In 1988, Sabina's diploma work on the theme of the pagan holiday "Novruz Bayram" (holiday of spring)—with nude symbolic figures—was never shown, as it blatantly challenged Soviet ideology. However, Sabina continued to paint on the theme of Novruz and subsequently two of these were purchased by the Tretyakov Gallery in Moscow as part of their modern art collection from Azerbaijan.

In the early 1990s, with the parting of the Iron Curtain, Shikhlinskaya was exhibited at the Galerie L'Orangeraie (Saint-Paul-de-Vence, France), which purchased her work on the theme of Nicolae Ceaușescu's death. Later in the 1990s, Sabina switched from painting to drawing, where she wove literary texts into graphic forms and images. In parallel, she began to experiment with land art, installation, and video. After her first attempt in 1996, where Sabina Shikhlinskaya and a group of Azerbaijani artists installed a labyrinth in the gallery space, she fully transitioned from traditional painting to contemporary art.

In 1999 Sabina curated and participated in a project on the theme of "Paradise Lost", in which participating artists collected found objects on the Absheron peninsula and created installations focused on Baku's environmental decay. In 2000, as part of another land art project about fire worship, Sabina made seven doors from fire, emulating an ancient Zoroastrian temple. In Sabina's last land art project, "Oil", she used petrol as her painting medium.

Since 2006, Sabina has extensively explored video art. Her first video installation, "Hamam", illustrating an old traditional Sufi ritual of bathing and cleansing, was exhibited worldwide. In 2007, Shikhlinskaya made her second video project, " Ship Bolshevik Narimam Narimanov" – filming an abandoned Soviet shipwreck and combining the visual image with interviews of artists on the subject of post-Soviet change and stagnation. "Dangerous Red", one of her latest works, is a commentary on violence and its presence in everyday life. As an installation, it was exhibited in Georgia, Azerbaijan, Poland, Norway, Korea, France, and Netherland in 2009 -2012.

In 2011 Sabina Shikhlinskaya created a new series of paintings titled "No Comment" in the stencil technique. This work has the strongly pronounced social maintenance directed on the criticism of problems of a modern society.

Shikhlinskaya's works are presented in the collections : Tretyakovskaya State Gallery, Russia; Ministry of Culture of Russia; Ministry of Culture of Azerbaijan; Baku Museum of Modern Art, Azerbaijan; Giz Galasi Gallery, Baku, Azerbaijan; Yeni Gallery, Baku, Azerbaijan; BP headquarters in Baku, Azerbaijan; Istanbul, Turkey; London, UK; International Bank of Azerbaijan; and The Central and East European Art Foundation / Meda Mladek / Nahit Kabakci collection, Turkey.

Private collections: Azerbaijan, Turkey, Israel, UK, Austria, Germany, Denmark, Norway, France, Italy, USA, Canada, Japan, Australia.

== Selected exhibitions and projects ==
- 2012 — 1st Tbilisi Triennial "Offside Effect", Georgia
- 2012 — 30th Council of Europe Art Exhibition. “The Desire for Freedom. Art in Europe since 1945", German Historical Museum, Berlin, Germany
- 2012 – Documenta 13, Pavilion of Critical Art Ensemble, Kassel, Germany
- 2012 – Global Village 2012 "Project 072", Alkmaar, Netherlands
- 2011 – "WMD" – Contemporary Art from Azerbaijan, Centre of Contemporary Art, Baku, Azerbaijan
- 2011 – "PROXIMITY" joint exhibition of PROUN Gallery, Docks on the Seine, Paris, France
- 2011 – "Impossible Community", project "Portrait of 19 million", State Museum of Modern Art of the Russian Academy of Arts, Moscow, Russia
- 2011 – "The Journey to the East" Galeria Arsenal, Bialystok, MOCAK, Poland.
- 2011 – "Harmony", Yeoksam Culture Centre, Seoul, Korea
- 2010 – "USSR-remix" Azerbaijan Contemporary Art, Art Centre Tou Scene, Stavanger, Norway
- 2010 – MONGOLIA 360’ Land Art Mongolia, Mongolian National Modern Art Gallery, Ulaanbaatar, Mongolia
- 2009 – TRANSKAUKAZJA International Festival, Centre of Contemporary Art, Uyazdovski Castle, Warsaw, Poland
- 2008 – "Artisterium" 1st Tbilisi International Contemporary Art Exhibition and Art Events, Karvasla Tbilisi History Museum, Georgia
- 2008 – 3d International Contemporary Art Festival Cappadocia in Mustafapasa, Turkey
- 2008 – "Steps of Time" Modern and Contemporary Azerbaijan Art, project"USSR-remix", Dresden State Museum of Art, Germany
- 2007 – 52d Venice Biennale, Pavilion of Azerbaijan Republic, project "Land Art "FIRE", Italy
- 2007 – 3d International Biennial of Contemporary Art "Aluminium", Shirvanshakh's Palace, Baku, Azerbaijan
- 2006 – 4th International Painting Biennale of the Islamic World, Tehran, Iran
- 2005 – International Art Festival, Pavilion of Azerbaijan, Jerusalem, Israel
- 2004 – " Nargin" International Land Art symposium and workshop, Nargin Island. Absheron. Azerbaijan
- 1999 – 2005 – Land Art symposiums, workshops and exhibitions, Baku and regions, Azerbaijan
- 1996 – "Labyrinth" installation, workshop, Sattar Bahlulzadeh gallery, Baku, Azerbaijan

== Curatorial activity ==
Since 1993, artist, educator, and curator Sabina Shikhlinskaya has organized more than 50 exhibitions and projects in both Azerbaijani and international venues. In 1996, Shikhliskaya launched the "Labyrinth" project in Baku. This was the first contemporary art exhibition in Azerbaijan, resulting from a month-long workshop followed by a group installation by Azerbaijani artists. Following the success of this project, the twelve participating artists, under the leadership of Shikhlinskaya, formed the Labyrinth Art Group. In 1999, Sabina Shikhlinskaya curated the first land art project in Azerbaijan with the artists from the Labyrinth Art Group. This land art workshop, symposium, and exhibition were dedicated to the theme of "Paradise Lost" – the artists’ interpretation of the state of environment in Baku city and its surroundings. "Paradise Lost" was followed by the second symposium – "Paradise Found" in 2000, where the same participants created installations in the nature of the mountain areas of Azerbaijan. In 2001, Shikhlinskaya organized the third consecutive land art project on the theme of "Fire" – interpreting the ancient tradition of Zoroastrianism. For the next land art project in 2004 – "Nargin Island", Sabina Shikhlinskaya curated an international group of artists together with the Labyrinth members that inhabited an abandoned military island. Through painting, sculpting, and installation, the artists transformed the environment of the military debris into objects of their personal artistic interpretation.

In 2005, within the framework of "Aluminum" – Azerbaijan's second International Biennial of Contemporary Art—Sabina Shiklinskaya curated a public performance of the Labyrinth Art Group members, who painted and sculpted in the abandoned oil fields of Baku, thus transforming the nature of oil from its utilitarian purpose to the art medium.

In 2007, Sabina Shikhlinskaya was the curator of Azerbaijan's 1st pavilion at the 52nd Art Biennale in Venice. In 2008, Shikhlinskaya curated a group exhibition, "USSR – Remix" the artists’ discussion on the topic of post-communist traces in the mentality of peoples and nations once living under the Soviet regime. Later that year, USSR – Remix was exhibited in Dresden Museum of Art along with another group show curated by Shikhlinskaya – "Steps of Time" – a selection of artworks by Azerbaijani artists of different generations, from Soviet (both social realists and non-conformist) to young contemporary artists. In 2009 Sabina Shikhlinskaya organized "Maiden Tower", the international forum of contemporary art on the theme of gender that took place in Baku, Azerbaijan. In 2010 she continued the gender subject and curated the international video art exhibition "Openly" shown in Istanbul, Antrepo, Sanat Limani in the frames of "Istanbul – Capital of Culture of Europe". In 2010 Shikhlinskaya presented a new version of "USSR-remix" international group exhibition project in Center for Contemporary Art in Baku, Azerbaijan, and later in Tou Scene Art Centre, Stavanger, Norway. In 2011 she presented the project "USSR-remix" in the TRANSKAUKAZJA International Festival, Italian Passage, Warsaw, Poland.

Between 1996 and 2005, alongside her curatorial activities, Sabina Shikhlinskaya undertook a number of educational art projects in various institutions. She founded a school of painting for children, taught art in European Lyceum in Baku and TISA, the International School of Azerbaijan. She also conducted art therapy courses for vulnerable children: war refugees, orphans, and children with disabilities.

In both her educational and curatorial projects, Sabina Shikhlinskaya partnered with such organizations as the Solomon Guggenheim Museum, UNDP, UNESCO, UNIFEM, Open Society Institute, Apollonia Art Exchanges, Azerbaijan Ministry of Culture and Tourism, Azerbaijan Ministry of Youth and Sports, Azerbaijan Center for Contemporary Arts, Azerbaijani Artists Union, Museum of Fine Art of Azerbaijan, as well as cultural representations of French, Italian, German, Norwegian, and Japanese embassy missions in Azerbaijan.

== Selected curatorial projects ==
- 2011 — TRANSKAUKAZJA International Festival, project"USSR-remix", Italian Passage, Warsaw, Poland
- 2010 — “OPENLY” International Women Video art exh. in frame of “Istanbul 2010– Capital of Culture of Europe”, Antrepo5, Sanat Limani, Istanbul, Turkey
- 2010 — “USSR-remix” Azerbaijan Contemporary Art, Art Centre Tou Scene, Stavanger, Norway
- 2009 – "Maiden Tower" International Forum of Contemporary Art, exh., conference "To Be a Woman", Centre of Contemporary Art, UNDP office, Baku, Azerbaijan
- 2008 – "Steps of Time" Modern and Contemporary Azerbaijan Art, Dresden State Museum of Art, Germany
- 2007 – 52d Venice Biennale, 1st Pavilion of Azerbaijan Republic, Italy
- 2007 – "Alluminium" 3d International Biennale of Contemporary Art, Shirvanshakh's Palace, Baku, Azerbaijan
- 1999 – 2005 – Land Art simposiums, workshops and exhibitions, Baku and regions, Azerbaijan
