= Qaraqoyunlu, Barda =

Qaraqoyunlu
- Municipality
- Location within Azerbaijan Location within Karabakh Economic Region
- Coordinates: 40°25′N 47°10′E
- Country: Azerbaijan
- Rayon: Barda

Population
  - Total: 702
- Time zone: UTC+4 (AZT)
  - Summer (DST): UTC+5 (AZT)

Qaraqoyunlu (also, Karakoyunlu) is a village and municipality in the Barda Rayon of Azerbaijan. It has a population of 702.
