= Khurshidbanu Natavan =

Azerbaijani lyrical poet

- Xurşidbanu Utsmiyeva
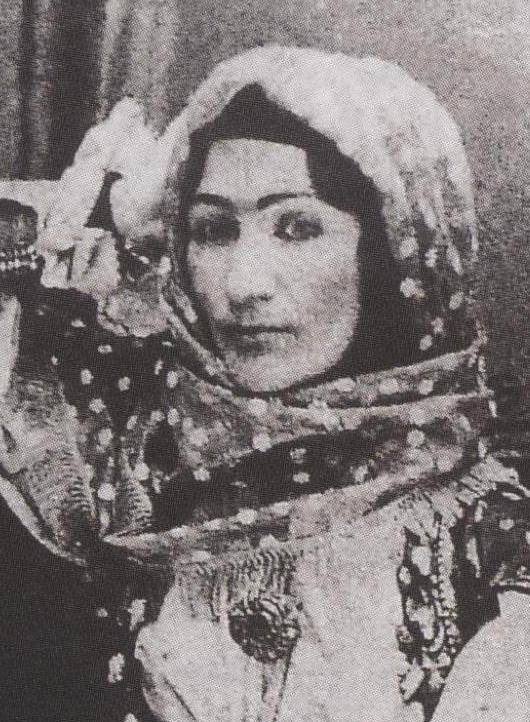
- Khurshidbanu Natavan
- Born: Xurşidbanu Natəvan; 6 August 1832; Shusha, Georgia Governorate, Caucasus Viceroyalty, Russian Empire
- Died: 2 October 1897 (aged 65); Shusha, Elisabethpol Governorate, Caucasus Viceroyalty, Russian Empire
- Resting place: Aghdam, Azerbaijan
- Spouse: Khasay Khan Utsmiyev
- Relatives: Mehdigulu Khan Javanshir
- Writing career
- Language: Azerbaijani; Persian
- Genres: Ghazal; Rubaʿi

Khurshidbanu Natavan (Azerbaijani: خورشیدبانو ناتوان / Xurşidbanu Natəvan; 6 August 1832 – 2 October 1897) was an Azerbaijani poet and philanthropist. She is considered one of the best lyrical poets of Azerbaijan. Her poems are in either Azerbaijani or Persian and she was most notable for her lyrical ghazals.

Natavan was the daughter of Mehdigulu Khan, the last ruler of the Karabakh Khanate (1748–1822).

== Life ==
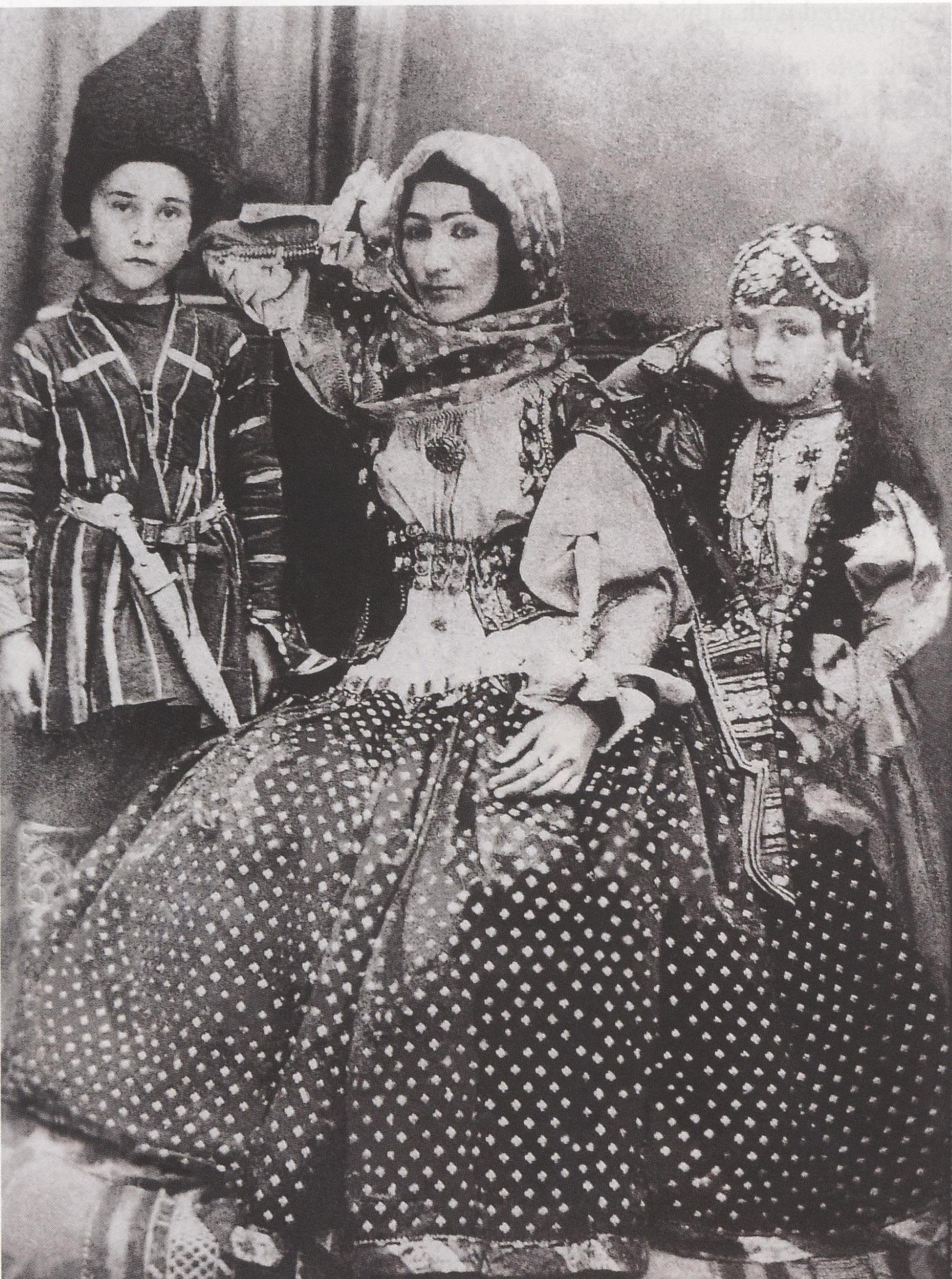
Khurshidbanu Natavan with her children from first marriage

Natavan was born on 5 August 1832 in Shusha, a town in present-day Azerbaijan, in Karabakh region, to Mehdigulu Khan (1763–1845) and Badir Jahan Begüm (1802-1861). Being the only child in the family and descending from Panah Ali Khan, she was the only heir of the Karabakh khan, known to the general public as the "daughter of the khan" (Azerbaijani: Xan qızı). Her name Khurshid Banu (Persian: خورشیدبانو) is from Persian and means "Lady Sun". Her pen name Natavan (ناتوان) is also from Persian and means powerless. She was named after her grandmother - Khurshud Begüm, daughter of Javad Khan.

After her father's death, she inherited vast amounts of land from her father including 1,315 households, 41 nomadic territories and seven villages, aged 14. She was put in the care of her aunt Gawhar agha who taught her music, poetry and painting. She probably married Kumyk noble Khasay Utsmiev in 1847. She inherited an additional nine villages from her mother Badir Jahan Begüm in 1861 after her death. She founded and sponsored the first literary societies in Shusha and in the whole of Azerbaijan. One of them called Majlis-i Uns ("Society of Friends") founded in 1864 became especially popular and concentrated major poetic-intellectual forces of Karabakh of that time.

Natavan was closely engaged in philanthropy, promoting the social and cultural development of Karabakh. Among her famous deeds was a water main that was first laid down in Shusha in 1872, thus solving the water problem of the townsfolk. The local Russian "Kavkaz" newspaper wrote at the time: "Khurshud Banu-Begum left an eternal mark in the memories of the Shushavians and her glory will pass on from generation to generation". The aqueduct built by Natavan from famous Shusha white stones were called by the townsfolks "Natavan springs" and were also considered historical monuments under protection.

Natavan also did a lot for the development and popularization of the famous breed of Karabakh horses. Natavan's Karabakh horses took part in the Exposition Universelle (1867), agricultural exhibition in Moscow (1869), in Tbilisi (1882) and were awarded golden medals and certificates of honour. Karabakh horses were also awarded at the Second All-Russian Exhibition in 1869: Meymun - silver medal, Tokmak - bronze medal. At the Exposition Universelle (1867) in Paris, Khan got a silver medal.

Humanism, kindness, friendship and love were the main themes of Natavan's ghazals and ruba'yat. These sentimental romantic poems express the feelings and sufferings of a woman who was not happy in her family life and who lost her son. Many of these poems are used in folk songs nowadays.

== Khurshidbanu Natavans Tomb ==
Natavan died in Shusha on 2 October 1897. She was buried in Aghdam in the Imarat Cemetery. After the occupation of Agdam District by Armenian forces following the First Nagorno-Karabakh war, her tomb was damaged. In January 2021, after control of the district was returned to Azerbaijan following the 2020 Nagorno-Karabakh war, French-Iranian Azerbaijani photojournalist Reza Deghati during his visit to Aghdam reported that the cemetery was destroyed and claimed that the tomb of Khurshidbanu Natavan was looted and her bones are missing.

== Monument in Shusha ==
According to the Azerbaijani government, a Soviet-era monument of Natavan in Shusha by sculptor Hayat Abdullayeva, and other famous monuments of Karabakh Azerbaijanis including Hajibekov and Bulbul, which once decorated the central streets of Shusha, were severely damaged and dismantled by Armenian forces. Polad Bulbuloghlu, then the Minister of Culture of Azerbaijan bought the bronze busts from a Georgian scrap metal yard and transported them to Baku.

Thomas de Waal who saw the monuments in Baku, wrote:

"I saw the three bronze heads, forlorn and pocked with bullets, lying in the courtyard of the headquarters of the Red Cross in the center of Baku: the poet Natevan, an earnest girl in a head scarf reading a book, missing a thumb; the composer Hajibekov, a bullet-ridden gentleman in double-breasted suit and broken spectacles; and Bul Bul, a famous singer with a serious domed bronze forehead".

The monuments were kept in the yard of the Azerbaijani Museum of Arts in Baku for many years, with Natavan's bust returning to Shusha on 16 January 2021 after the city's recapture by Azerbaijan.

== Family ==
Ancestors of Khurshidbanu Natavan

16. Ibrahim agha Javanshir
8. Panah Ali Khan
4. Ibrahim Khalil Khan
2. Mehdigulu Khan Javanshir
20. a son of Kelb Ali Musahib-Ganjavi
10. Shahverdi Khan of Ganja (= 24; 28)
5. Khurshid begüm
11. Sharafjahan Khanum (= 25;29)
1. Khurshidbanu Natavan
24. Shahverdi Khan of Ganja (= 10; 28)
12. Javad Khan
25. Sharafjahan Khanum (= 11;29)
6. Ughurlu Khan of Ganja
13. Shukufa khanum
3. Badir Jahan Begüm
28. Shahverdi Khan of Ganja (= 10; 24)
14. Muhammad Hasan, Khan of Ganja
29. Sharafjahan Khanum (= 11;25)
7. Sharaf Jahan begüm
30. Muhammad Khan of Gazikumukh
15. Huru Bika
31. Ustajlu lady

She probably married Kumyk nobleman, Khasay Utsmiev, in 1847 and had two children with him:

- Mehdigulu Khan Vafa — Poet, lieutenant-colonel of Imperial Russian Army
- Khanbike Khanum (1856–1921) — Poet

She later married a commoner named Seyyid Huseyn Agamirov (1833–1891) in 1866 with whom she had five children:

- Mir Abbas Agha (1868–1885)
- Mir Hasan Agha (1870–1903)
- Mir Jabbar Agha (?–1914)
- Sara Begum
- Hajar Bike (1869–?)

== See also ==
- House of Khurshidbanu Natavan
- Bust of Khurshidbanu Natavan
