= Munavvar Rzayeva =

Azerbaijani sculptor (1929–2004)

- Born: Rzayeva Münəvvər Məcid qızı 6 June 1929; Shusha, Nagorno-Karabakh Autonomous Oblast, Azerbaijan SSR, TSFSR, USSR
- Died: 6 June 2004 (aged 75); Baku, Azerbaijan
- Education: Azerbaijan State Art School named after Azim Azimzade; Surikov Moscow State Institute of Art
- Known for: Sculptor
- Awards: Honored Artist of the Azerbaijan Republic

Munavvar Rzayeva (Azerbaijani: Münəvvər Rzayeva, 6 June 1929 – 6 June 2004) was an Azerbaijani sculptor and the first monumental female sculptor, Honored Artist of the Azerbaijan Republic.

== Biography ==
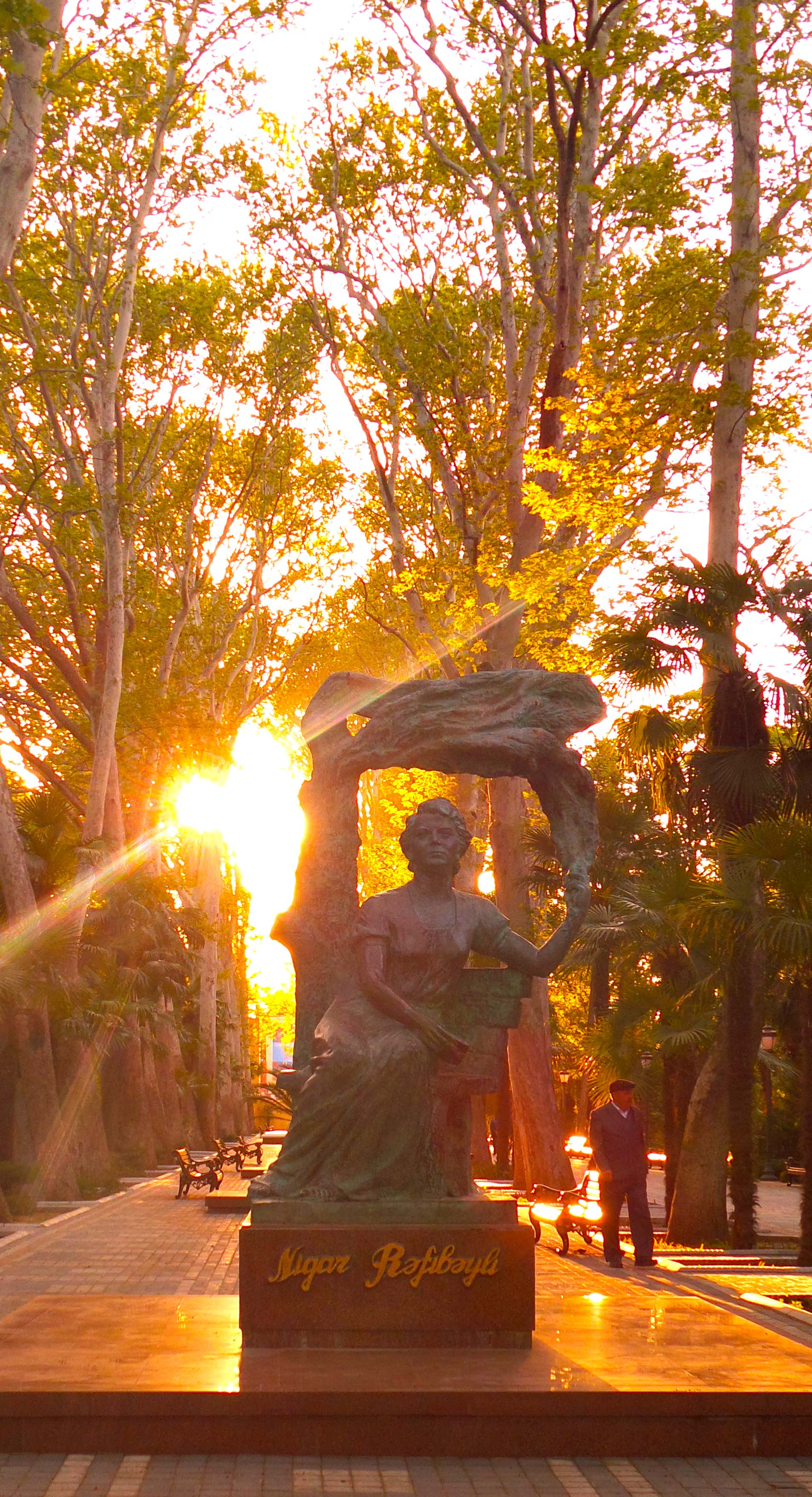
Sculpture of Nigar Rafibeyli

Munavvar Rzayeva was born on 6 June 1929 in Shusha. She grew up in the family of a carpet master, Majid, in Shusha. In 1950 Rzayeva graduated from Azerbaijan State Art School named after Azim Azimzade in Baku, and in 1956 from the Faculty of Sculpture of the Moscow State Academy of Arts named after V.I.Surikov. She was educated in the class of Nikolai Tomsky.

From 1943, she participated in various exhibitions. Rzayeva has been an elected member of the Union of Artists of Azerbaijan since 1953. At the same time, he was a member of the State Commission of the Ministry of Culture, worked as a restorer artist at the Nizami Literature Museum of ANAS and restored a number of sculptures.

Her works are kept in National Art Museum of Azerbaijan, Nizami Museum of Azerbaijani Literature, Ordubadi Museum, Siyazan House of Culture, and the Art Foundation.

M.Rzayeva was a master of psychological portraits. She had used granite, marble, bronze, wood, etc. materials to create sculptures. Munavvar Rzayeva's works mainly consisted of sculptures of art workers, including statues, busts, and bas-reliefs of statesmen and labor heroes. The busts of Huseyn Javid, Sergey Yesenin, Nariman Narimanov, Mikayil Mushfig and Nazim Hikmet play a special role in her creative activity.

Munavvar Rzayeva died on 6 June 2004 in Baku.

== Awards ==
- Honored Artist of the Azerbaijan Republic – 4 March 1992

== Memorial ==
In 2019, the 90th anniversary of Munavvar Rzayeva was celebrated.

== Works ==
Dedicated to	Date	Location	Notes
Sevil Gaziyeva	1969	Baku	bas-relief (bronze)
Mikayil Mushfig	1970	Baku	bust (granite)
Sergey Yesenin	1977	Mardakan	sculpture
Ayna Sultanova	1986	Baku	bust
Mehdikhan Vakilov	1976	Baku (2nd Alley of Honor)	sculpture
Alibala Shirinov	1973	Baku (2nd Alley of Honor)	sculpture
Bahmanyār		Baku (Nizami Museum of Azerbaijani Literature)	bust (marble)
Imadaddin Nasimi		Baku	sculpture (wood)
Samad Vurgun	1966	Imishli	sculpture
Sevil Gazıyeva	1972	Zaqatala	sculpture
Mirza Alakbar Sabir	1973	Quba	bust
Mahsati	1983	Ganja	sculpture
Mikayil Mushfig	1989	Khizi District (Sayadli)	sculpture
Nigar Rafibeyli	1998	Ganja	sculpture (bronze)
Heydar Aliyev	1998	Qusar	bas-relief (bronze)
