= Khanbika Khanum =

Azerbaijani poet (1856–1921)

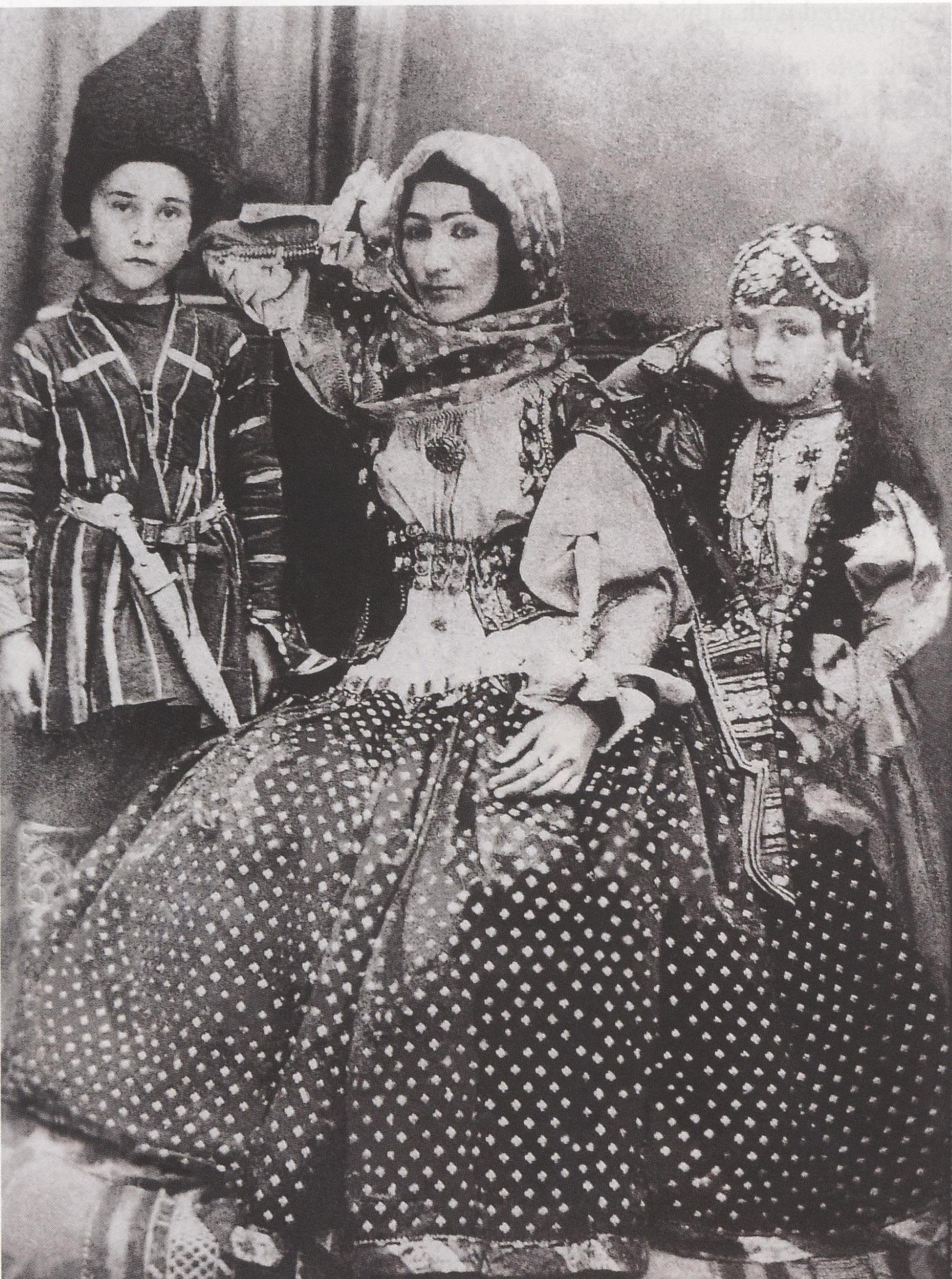
- Born: Khanbika Khanum; 1856; Shusha
- Died: 1921 (aged 64–65); Aghdam
- Occupation: Poet

Khanbika Khanum (b. 1856, Shusha, Russian Empire - d. Aghdam, Azerbaijan SSR, 1921) was an Azerbaijani-speaking poet of the Javanshir clan.

== Life ==
She was born in 1856 in the city of Shusha. Researcher Beylar Mammadov claims that her real name was Fatmabika. In 1872, she married Colonel Amanulla Khan, a descendant of Nakhchivan Khans. Akbar Nakhchivanski, her son from this marriage, donated to the museum the figures, the ivory chessman that Alexandre Dumas gave to Khurshidbanu Natavan. After the death of Colonel Amanulla Khan (1845-1891), she married the merchant Jabbar Alasgarov.

=== Family ===
She belonged to the Karabakh khans on her mother's side, and the Qumuq khans on her father's side. Her father was a Kumyk major-general, Khasay Khan Utsmiyev (1808–1866). Her grandfather Mehdigulu Khan was the last khan of Karabakh. Her mother was an Azerbaijani poet and philanthropist. Her brother Mehdigulu Khan Vafa was a lieutenant colonel in the Imperial Russian Army and authored poetry under pseudonym Vafa (Persian: وفا, lit. 'Loyal').

She died in 1921 and was buried in the Imarat cemetery, which is the cemetery of the family of Karabakh khans.

== Poetry ==
She started writing poems from childhood under the influence of Mirza Sadiq Sadiq and Mirza Rahim Fena. She mainly wrote ghazals and rubaʿi. Khanbika Beyim wrote poems in Azerbaijani Turkish and Persian languages. One of the people who influenced her the most in her poetry is her mother Khurshidbanu Natavan. Few of her works have been published in the press of that time. The main part of her works was discovered from the archives and published in modern times. Several of her ghazals were published in Vasif Guliyev's book The Path to Yesterday. This book shows that Khanbika was one of the participants of "Majlisi-uns".

== See also ==
- Gamar Sheyda
