= Aghdam Mugham Center =

- Ağdam Muğam Mərkəzi
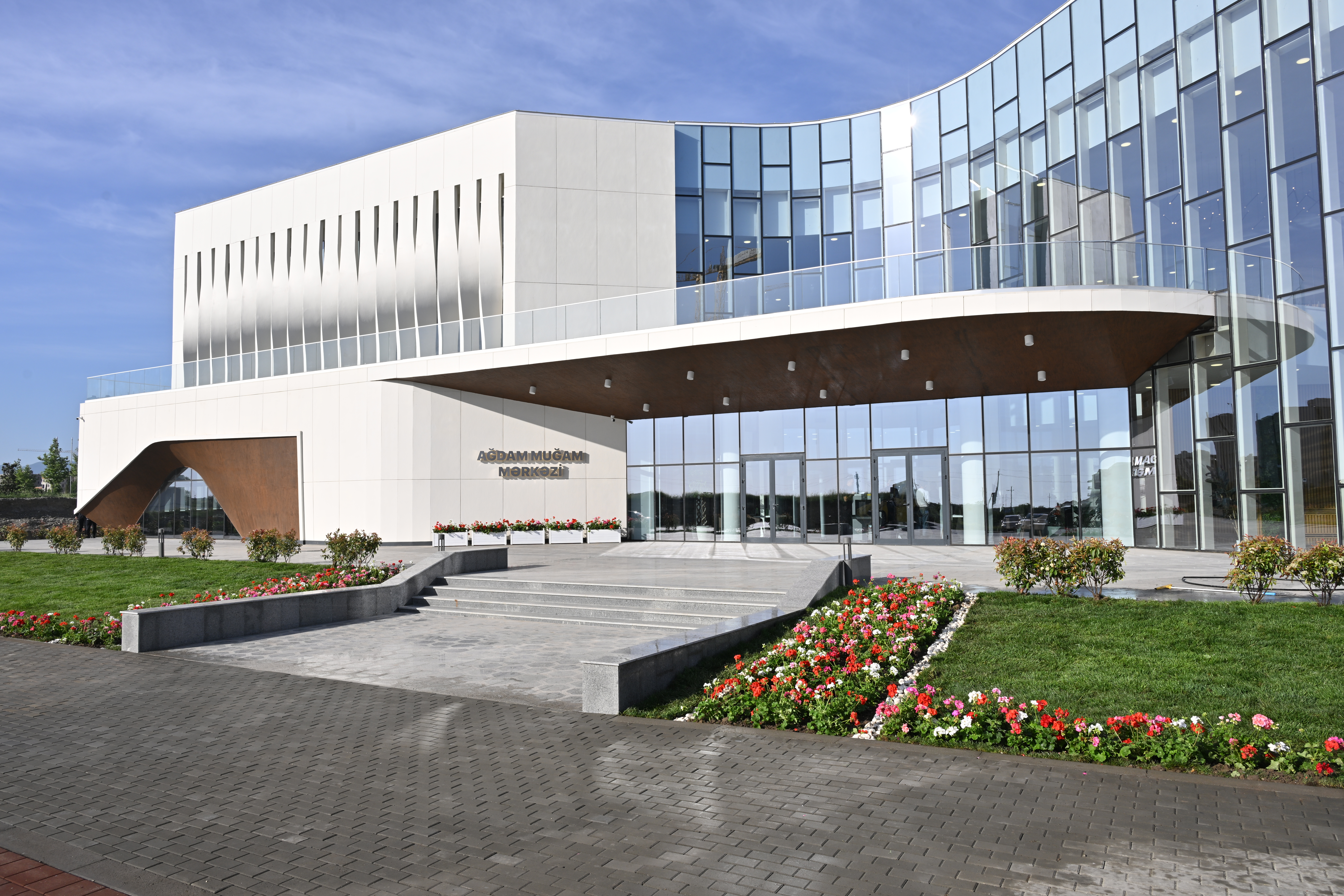

General information
- Status: Completed
- Classification: Cultural center
- Location: Aghdam, Azerbaijan
- Groundbreaking: 2 May 2023
- Inaugurated: 10 May 2025

Technical details
- Size: 1.4 ha
- Floor count: 2

Other information
- Seating type: Theater seating
- Seating capacity: 474 (concert hall); 615 (open-air amphitheater)
- Facilities: Concert hall, open-air amphitheater, classrooms, cinema hall, library, exhibition hall, dance halls, café

Aghdam Mugham Center (Azerbaijani: Ağdam Muğam Mərkəzi) is a cultural center located in the city of Aghdam, Azerbaijan. The center is dedicated to mugham, a traditional Azerbaijani musical genre inscribed on the UNESCO Representative List of the Intangible Cultural Heritage of Humanity.

== History ==
The foundation of the Aghdam Mugham Center was laid on 2 May 2023 by Ilham Aliyev and Mehriban Aliyeva.

On 18 February 2024, they visited the center to review the progress of construction works.

Following the completion of construction, the official opening ceremony took place on 10 May 2025.

== Architecture and facilities ==
The center was built on a site covering 1.4 hectares.

The first floor includes a café, a cinema hall, a library, and two dance halls. The concert hall has a seating capacity of 474. The second floor contains administrative offices, a meeting room, offices for instructors and management, and an exhibition hall.

The center includes 15 classrooms. An open-air amphitheater with a total area of 1,250 square metres and a seating capacity of 615 has also been constructed on the premises.
