= Panah Ali Khan's Palace =

Architectural monument in Azerbaijan

- Azerbaijani: Pənahəli xanın sarayı Persian: کاخ پناه علی خان
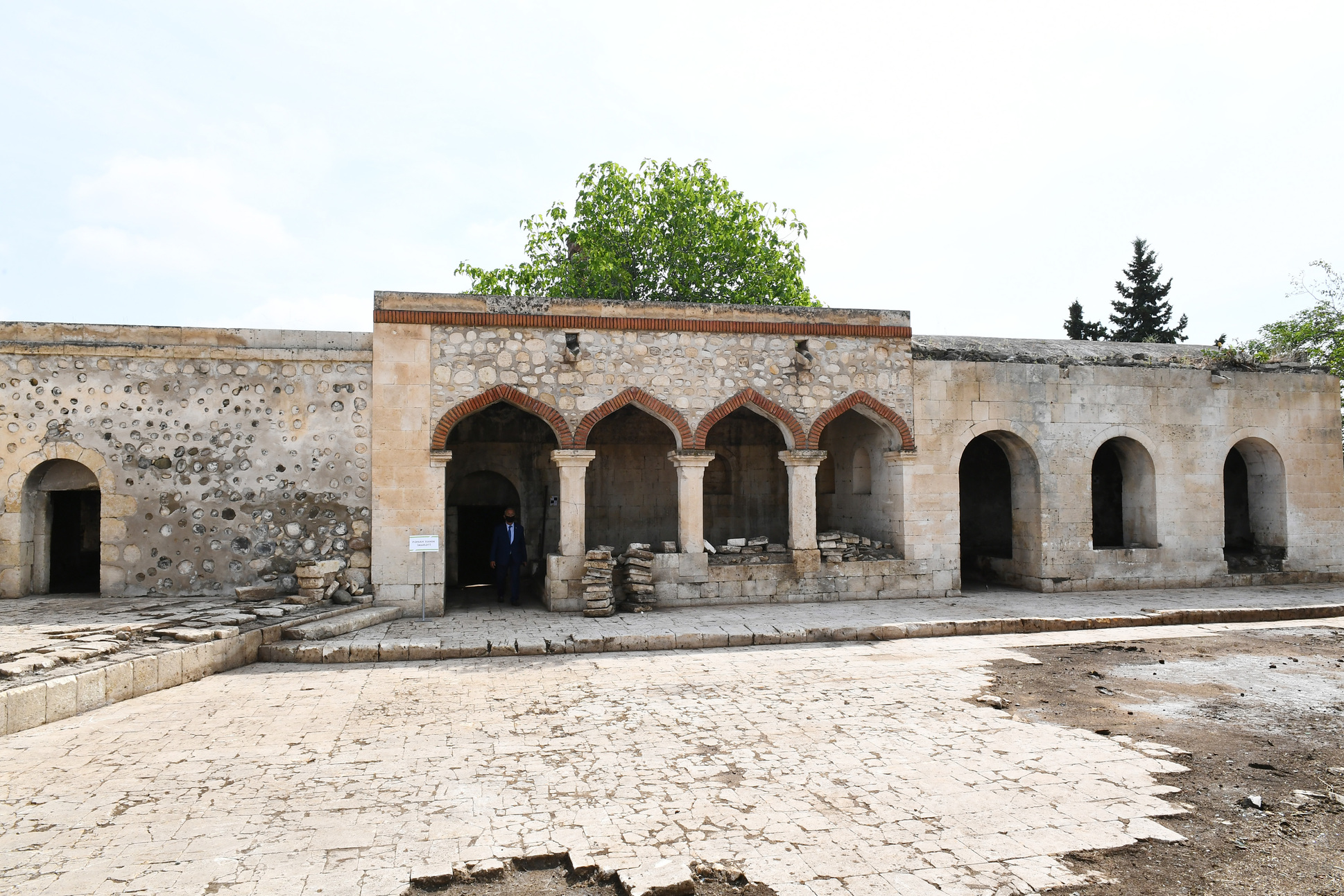
- Interactive map of Panah Ali Khan's Palace
- Location: Azerbaijan, Aghdam
- Completion date: 18th century

Panah Ali Khan’s Palace (Azerbaijani: Pənahəli xanın sarayı, Persian: کاخ پناه علی خان) or Imarat Panah Ali Khan (Azerbaijani: Pənahəli xanın imarəti, Persian: عمارت پناه علی خان) is the residence of the Karabakh khan Panah Ali Khan Javanshir, situated in the city of Aghdam. Near the palace is located the Imarat cemetery - the Javanshir family cemetery.

The name of the city of Aghdam comes from the residence of the Imarat.

By the order of the Cabinet of Ministers of the Republic of Azerbaijan dated with 2 August 2001, the palace was taken under the state protection as an architectural monument of local importance (No. 4026).

== Description ==
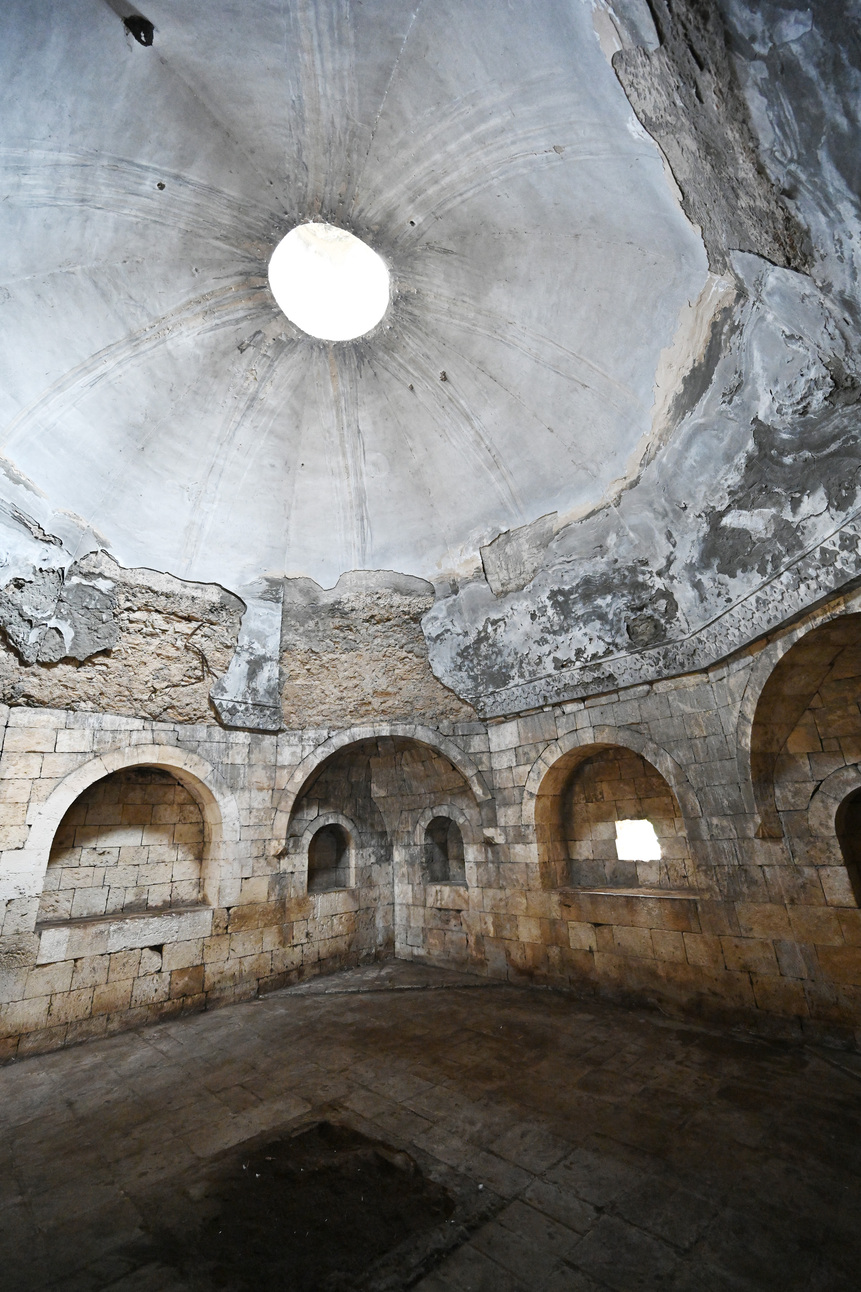
Dome Hall (May 2021)

This edifice is far from the ceremonial palaces, and is the dwelling house of a feudal ruler who was still on the way to elevation.

Panah Khan’s house consisted of two buildings located perpendicular to each other. The main building features several vaulted rooms grouped around a central domed hall with an eivan in front of it, facing south. This hall is a sofa-khane - the official half of the palace or the house of a rich man.

The eivan of the monument was determined by a three-span arcade. Pointed arches rested on columns of solid stone. In general, the eivan had the appearance of a portico - the central entrance into the building.

The main hall was covered with an octagonal dome on trompes with a small opening in the form of a lantern at its top. In such a device, one can see the connection with the residential building of the "karadam" type with a hole in the center of the ceiling for smoke outlet.

Panakh Khan’s Palace is interesting as a dwelling example, which carries the features that connect it with the types of dwellings that existed in Azerbaijan. The elements of this connection are the domed hall with an eivan, vaulted rooms, the presence of numerous niches, the orientation of the main residential buildings to the south, etc. The palace is connected with the residential buildings of Ordubad and Absheron by the striving for a perimeter, single-row arrangement of premises.

The authors of the first details publication about the monument considered the side building to be a mosque, but the architect and art critic Abdul Vagab Salamzadeh does not agree with this.

== See also ==
- Shusha fortress
- Palace of Karabakh Khans
