= Jeyhun Mammadov =

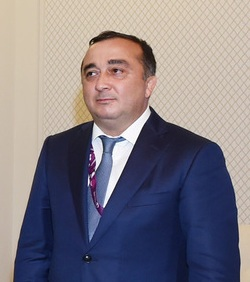

Personal information
- Nationality: Azerbaijan
- Citizenship: Azerbaijani
- Born: 23 May 1968 (age 58) Ağdam

Sport
- Sport: sambo

Jeyhun Mammadov is an Azerbaijani sambo wrestler, multiple world and European champion, Honored Master of Sports of the USSR.

== Biography ==
At the age of 11, he enrolled in the freestyle wrestling section, then switched to sambo. A pupil of the Aghdam Sambo school. The coaches are Jafar Mammadov and Abulfaz Aliyev. He fought in the categories up to 48 and 52 kg .

Jeyhun Mammadov won the first World Youth Championship in 1987. He won the title of USSR and world champion in 1988. He became the winner of the USSR and World Cup in 1989, and in 1990 — the European champion.

In 1992, Mammadov did the "golden double", became European champion and world champion. In 1993, he repeats this achievement.

Honored Worker of Physical Culture and Sports of Azerbaijan.

President of the Sambo Federation of Azerbaijan (since 2003).

He was vice-president of the European Sambo Federation (since May 13, 2016).

He was a member of the executive committee of the European Sambo Federation

== Sports results ==
- USSR SAMBO Championship in 1988 — 1
- USSR Sambo Championship 1990 — 1
- USSR Sambo Championship 1991 — 1
- 9-time world champion
- 6-time European champion
- twice winner of the World Cup
