= Nushaba Mammadli =

Nushaba Mammadli Nüşabə Məmmədli
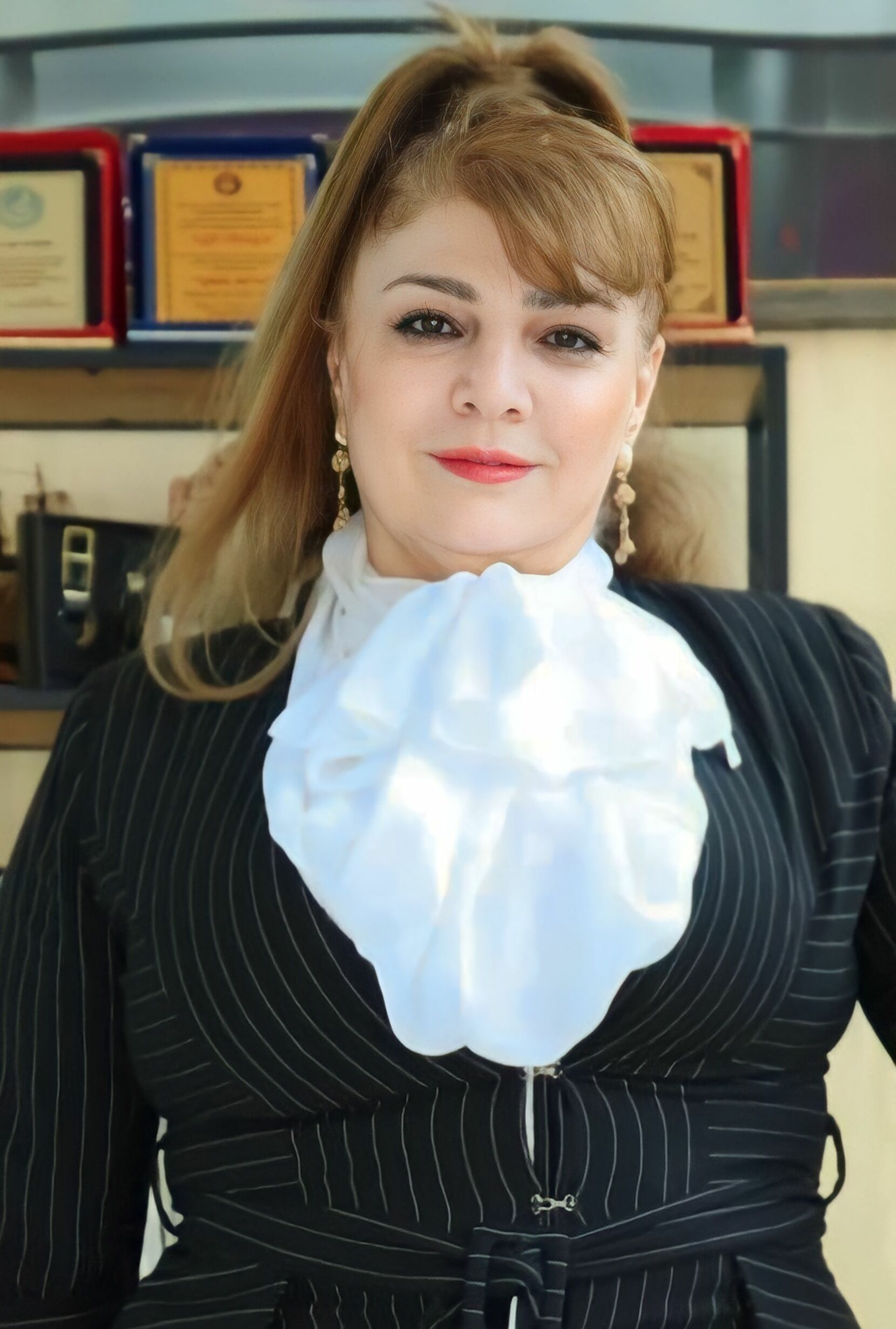
- Born: 6 January 1953 (age 73); Aghdam, Azerbaijan SSR, USSR
- Education: Azerbaijan State Institute of Foreign Languages
- Occupations: writer, publicist

Nushaba Mahammadali gizi Mammadli (Mammadova) (born 6 January 1953) is an Azerbaijani writer, publicist, member of the Union of Azerbaijani Writers and member of the Azerbaijan Journalists Union, chairman of the public association (NGO) "Society of Women Writers of Azerbaijan", founder and editor-in-chief of the magazine "Women writers".

== Biography ==
Nushaba Mahammadali gizi Mammadli (Mammadova) was born on 6 January 1953 in the city of Aghdam of the Republic of Azerbaijan. After graduating from high school, she enrolled in the Azerbaijan State Institute of Foreign Languages, which she successfully graduated with a profession of an English teacher. She began her career as an English teacher in a secondary school.

N.Mammadli worked as a correspondent, deputy editor-in-chief, editor-in-chief for the newspapers "Adalat", "Interfax", "Reporter", "Karvan". N.Mammadli began to engage in creativity from her youth (1967). She is the author of numerous essays, prose poems, anecdotes, satirical stories, short stories, essays, parables, legends, as well as allegorical stories and large-volume novels. She dedicated many works to Karabakh, martyrs (innocent victims of the war), refugees and women who were captured. Nushaba Mammadli's novel "Roulades, or the Voice of the Crying in the Desert" ("Zəngulə"), reciting the fate of women who were captured, was awarded prizes in various nominations both in Azerbaijan and in other countries of the world. In 2005, the novel was declared the "Book of the Year" in Azerbaijan. Nushaba Mammadli's documentary novel "Göylərdə keçən ömür" ("Life passed in heaven"), the book of stories "Bu bir oyundur" ("This is a game"), the novels "Zəngulə" ("Rulads, or the voice of one crying in the wilderness"), "Vicdan dustağı" ("In the conclusion of conscience"), "Sevgi xiyabanı" ("Alley of love") were met by readers with great interest.

The writer was awarded the G.R.Derzhavin award by the Union of Writers of the Russian Federation for her work "Rulady, or the voice of one crying in the wilderness" ("Zəngulə") and for her significant contribution to national literature. N.Mammadli is the author of about 1000 journalistic articles. While living in Ust-Ilimsk, Irkutsk region of the Russian Federation, in order to bring the truth about the events in Karabakh to the public, she published articles in the newspapers "Komsomolskaya pravda", "Argumenty i fakty", "Ust-Ilimskaya Pravda". N.Mammadli is the author of over 10 stories about the devastating earthquake that occurred in 2023 in fraternal Turkey. In 2014, for participating in the First Symposium of the Eurasian Turkic World on the publication of children's literature, she received a certificate from the circle of the Association of Librarians of Eurasia.

N.Mammadli is the author of over 10 stories about the earthquake that occurred in 2023 in Turkey. Her works have been translated into Russian, Turkish, English, Uzbek and Ukrainian. Mammadli's books are kept in the collections of libraries in England, the Russian Federation, Turkey, the Czech Republic, Germany, Serbia, Slovenia, Ukraine, Uzbekistan, Turkmenistan. N.Mammadli has been awarded many awards, prizes and Certificates of Honor.

She is married and has a son.

== Selected works ==
- «80 budağın hərəsindən bir yarpaq» (2001) («One leaf from 80 branches»)
- «Zəngulə» (2003) («Roulade»)
- «Çadralı qadın» (2004) («A woman in a veil»)
- «Bayraq, papaq və həqiqət» (2005) («Flag, hat and truth»)
- «Qarasel qarı» (2006) («Old Garacel»)
- «Həyat çiçəyi» (2007) («Flower of Life»)
- «Bu bir oyundur» (2008) («It's a game»)
- «Göylərdə keçən ömür» (2008) («A life spent in heaven»)
- «Рулады, или глас вопиющего в пустыне» (2009) («Roulades, or the voice of one crying in the desert»)
- «Vicdan dustağı» (2010) («In the conclusion of conscience»)
- «Sevgi xiyabanı» (2011) («Alley of Love»)
- «Son addım» (2013) («The last step»)
- «Qondarma qız» (2015) («Fake girl»)
- «Təsəlli» (2017) («Consolation»)
- «Türk koymadı yüreğimi söksünler» (2018) («The Turk didn't let my heart be destroyed»)
- «Əsərlər» I cild (2019) («Writing» I Volume)
- «Əsərlər» II cild (2021) («Writing» II Volume)
- «Əsərlər» III cild (2022) («Writing» III Volume)
- «Əsərlər» IV cild (2022) («Writing» IV Volume)
- «Zəfər zənguləsi» (2024) («Roulade of Victory»)

== Main awards ==
- «Winner of the Socialist competition in 1978» (1979)
- National Award "Memory" («Yaddaş» milli mükafatı) (2005)
- Diploma "Laureate of the media award khan kyzi Natavan" («Xan qızı Natəvan Media Mükafatı Laureatı») (2005)
- The "Wealth and Respect" Award («Sərvət və Səxavət» mükafatı) (2007)
- Rasul Rza International Literary Award («Rəsul Rza» adına Beynəlxalq ədəbi mükafat) (2007)
- Crystal Feather Award («Billur qələm» mükafatı) (2007)
- Order of G.R.Derzhavin (Russian Federation, 2010)
- "Samad Vurgun Award" («Səməd Vurğun mükafatı») (2011)
- Diploma "The most widely read and favorite writer of the year" («İlin ən çox oxunan və sevilən yazıçısı» Diplomu (2011)
