= Aghdam Tea House =

Tea House in Aghdam
- Ağdamda Çay Evi
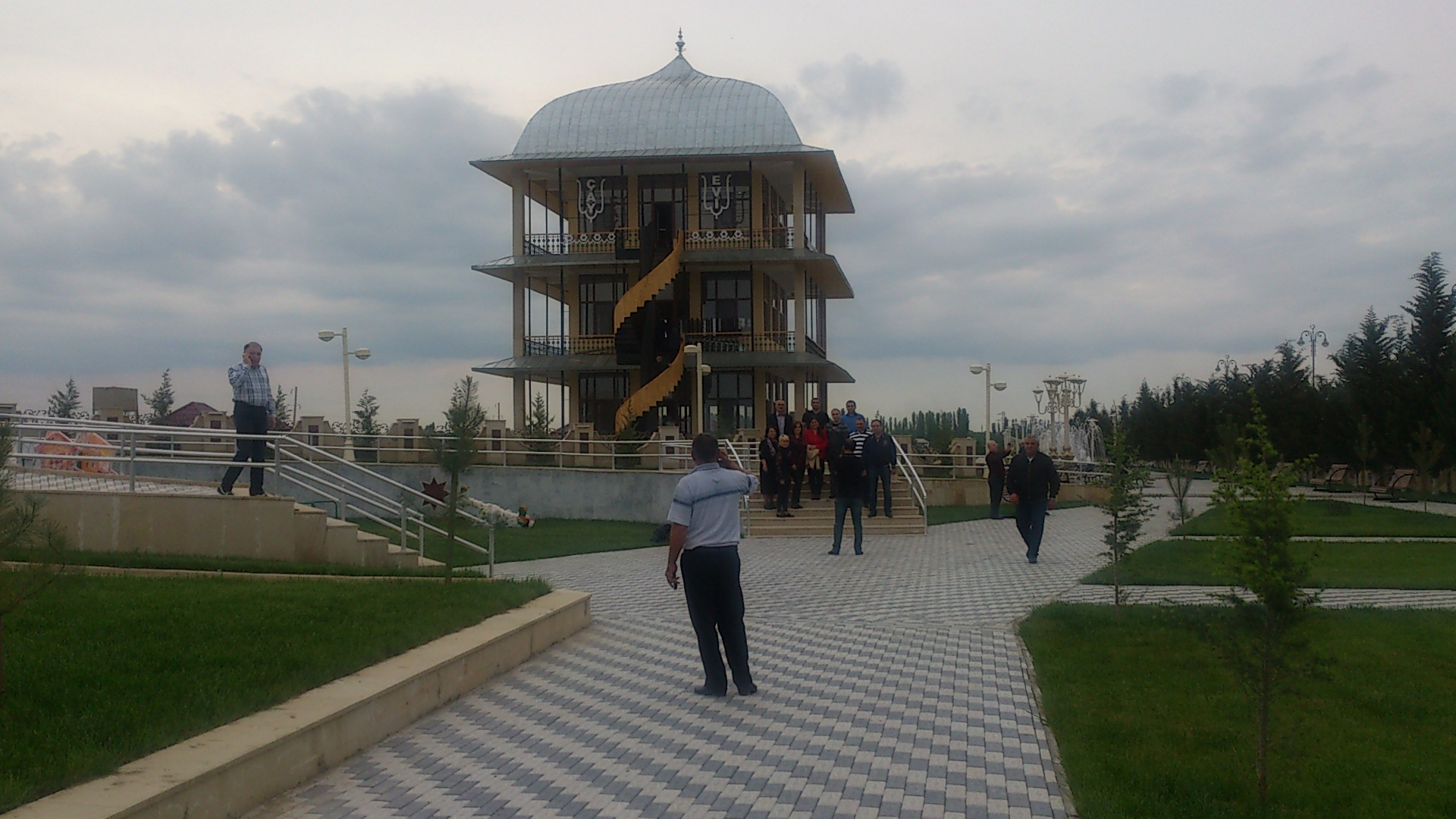
- Replica Aghdam Teahouse in Guzanli

General information
- Location: Aghdam, Azerbaijan
- Completed: 26 July 1986
- Demolished: 1993

Technical details
- Floor count: 3

The Aghdam Tea House was a public building in the city of Aghdam, Azerbaijan. It was one of the landmarks of the city.

== History ==
The teahouse was based on the idea of the academician Khudu Mammadov and with Naik Samadov as the chief architect. The project was built near the Juma Mosque, in the mid 1980s, though it was initially objected by the soviet officials, due to its ostentatious architecture and the negative connotations of teahouses and their associated lifestyle. The teahouse was eventually approved as part of an anti-alcohol campaign and was opened on 26 July 1986

In addition to the regional officials, Vafa Guluzade, the head of the Culture Department of the CP CC of Azerbaijan SSR, also participated in the opening ceremony. The article published in the July 31, 1986, issue of "The Lenin Path", on the occasion of the opening of the tea house, reads:

"After the decision of the Communist Party of the Soviet Union on the "Drunkenness and Alcoholization Measures", our district has a lot of activities. The Tea House, which is being used today, is of great importance in this respect. Role of the Tea House is indispensable for the workers to spend their leisure time effectively."

== Design ==
The structure was centred around a wide pipe in the middle of the teahouse. On each side, small volumes of tubes were merged with structures. Each floor and partition was made of wood and internal pipes were embellished with wood and decorated with various ornaments. Each floor had four doors. The dome of the tea house was roofed with galvanized iron. In all the structure was composed of approximately 100 tons of metal.

== Replication in Kuzanly ==
On May 10, 2015, a copy of the tea house was built in Guzanli settlement of Aghdam region. As part of a resettlement program in the area, there are plans to rebuild the teahouse at its original site, announced by Sabuhi Abdullayev in 2024, who is in charge of restoration and construction in the area.

== Gallery ==
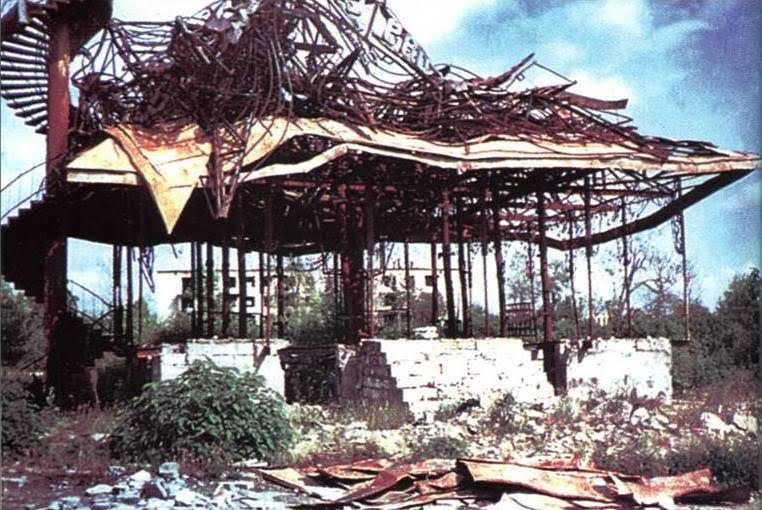
The ruins of the Tea House after occupation
