= Otuzikilar district =

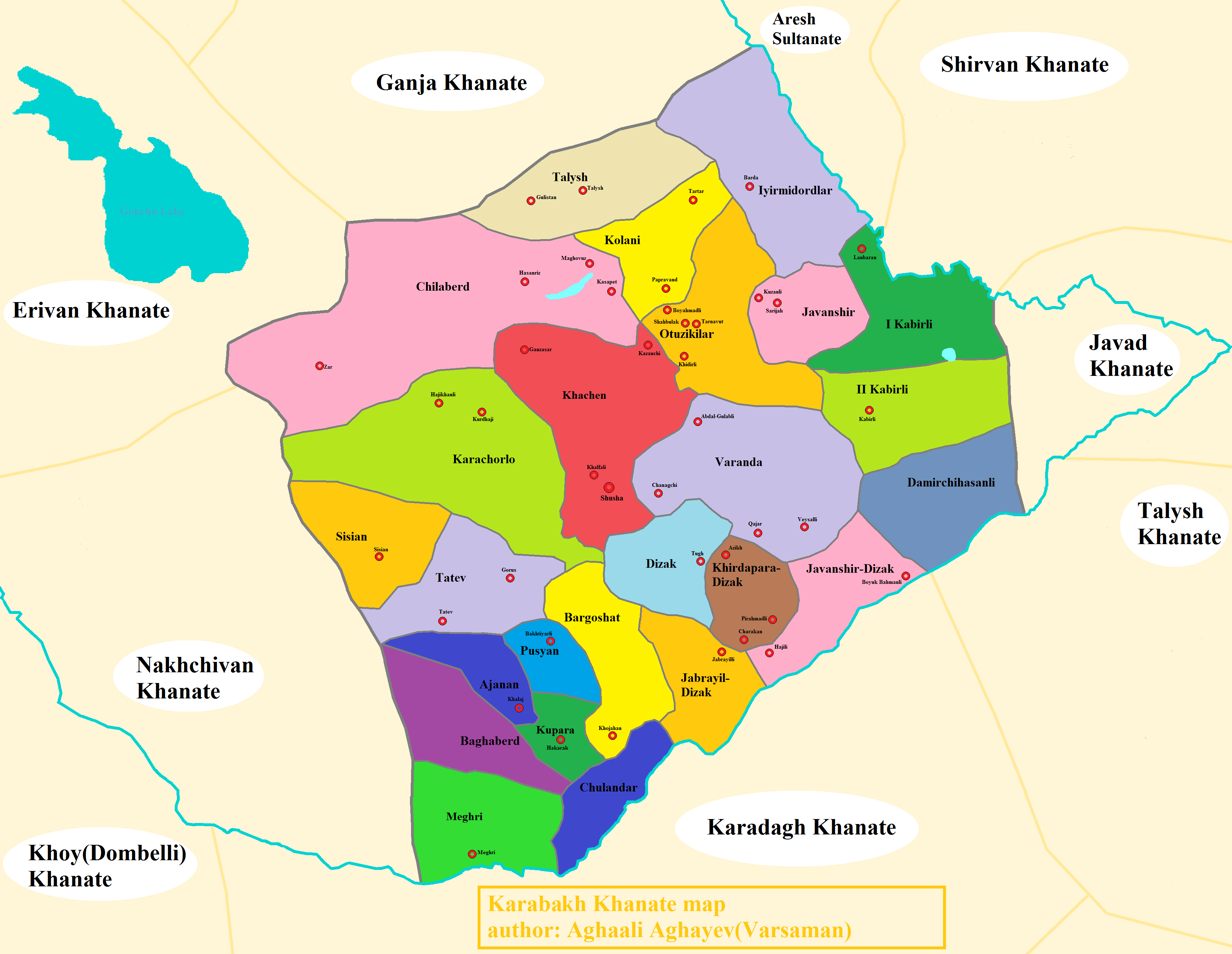
Karabakh khanate's mahals

Otuzikilar district or mahal of Otuzikilar (Azerbaijani: Otuzikilər mahalı) was one of the mahals of the Karabakh khanate. Today, the territory of the Otuziki mahal, being historically small in area, corresponds to the territory of the Aghdam region of modern Azerbaijan.

== History ==
The district was established in 1747. The center of the district was Khidirli village. The district included the villages of Veysalli, Giyasli, Khalfaraddinli, Bayahmedli. It was bordered by Ikirmidordler in the west and north, Javanshir in the east, and Kabirli in the south. In the 16th century, an alliance of 32 Turkic tribes in Karabakh was formed. It is believed that the head of this union was from the Javanshir tribe. The Karabakh khanate consisted of 25 mahals - 1) Jevanshir-Dizak, 2) Khirdapara-Dizak, 3) Dizak, 4) Dizak-Jabrailly, 5) Chulundur, 6) Pusiyan, 7) Mehri, 8) Bergyushad, 9) Garachorlu, 10 ) Baghaburd, 11) Kyupara, 12) Ajanan-Turk, 13) Sisian, 14) Tatev, 15) Varanda, 16) Khachyn, 17) Celebiyurd, 18) Talysh, 19) Kolany, 20) Demirchigasanly, 21) Iyirmideord, 22 ) Otuziki, 23) Kebirli (I), 24) II Kebirli (II) and 25) Jevanshir.

Mahals were ruled by naibs, and villages within mahals were ruled by kendkhudas. 628 families (384 taxpayers, 244 non-payers) lived in 22 villages and oymags of the Otuziki mahal. The largest settlements were Safikyurd (70 families), Khydirly (59 families), Boyakhmedli (73 families), Paradinni (90 families), and the village of Aghjabedi (81 families). Mahal was under the control of minbashi - galabeyi (head of the fortress) Mammad Kelbi bey. The khan's treasury received taxes in the amount of 539 chervonets, 3571 rubles 85 kopecks. Azerbaijani Turks made up the majority of the population. Only in 2 small villages (Tashbashaly and Tashbashi) lived 10 non-Muslim families (1.59%).

Mahal was liquidated in 1840 and transformed into a Russian province. On the basis of the tsarist reform "Institution for the management of the Transcaucasian region" of April 10, 1840. Shusha district was formed as part of the Caspian region. The Otuzik mahal became part of the Kebirli section of the Shusha district.

== Naibs ==
- Muhammed Ali Khan Beyahmedli (1747-1749)
- Ali bey (1749-1775)
- Haji Lazim bey Otuziki (1775-1798)
- Muhammad Ali bey Otuziki (1798-1820)
- Muhammed bey Otuziki (1820-1822)

== See also ==
- Karabakh Khanate

== Sources ==
- Rashtiani, Goodarz (2018). "Iranian–Russian Relations in the Eighteenth Century". In Axworthy, Michael (ed.). Crisis, Collapse, Militarism and Civil War: The History and Historiography of 18th Century Iran. Oxford University Press. ISBN 978-0190250331.
