= Aghdam Bread Museum =

Museum in Aghdam, Azerbaijan

- Ağdam Çörək Muzeyi
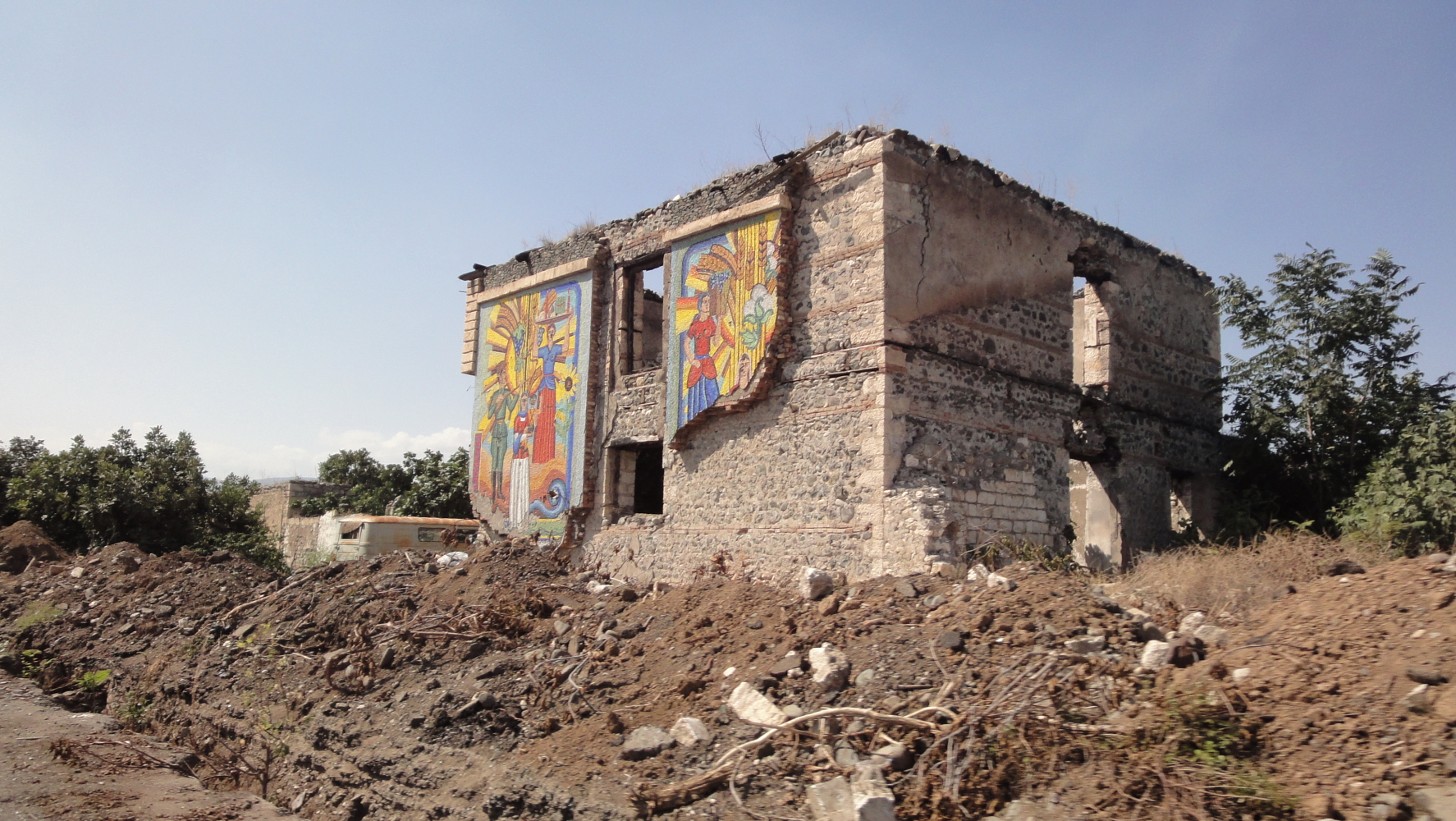

- Location within Azerbaijan Location within Caucasus Mountains
- Established: 25 November 1983
- Dissolved: 12 August 1992
- Location: Aghdam, Azerbaijan
- Coordinates: 39°59′30″N 46°55′54″E
- Collection size: 2800
- Directors: Allahverdi Asadov (1983-1984); Ofelya Zeynalova (1984-1987); Niyazi Guliyev (1987-1988); Hafiz Aliyev (1988-1992)

Aghdam Bread Museum was a designated museum of bread and bakery products, agricultural implements and their history, located in the city of Aghdam. The museum opened and received its first visitors on 25 November 1983. It had about 2800 exhibits and was protected by state as a cultural monument. The "Sunbul" Cafe operated on the adjacent territory of the museum.

== History ==
The initiative to create the Museum of Bread in Aghdam belonged to the first secretary of the regional committee of the Communist Party of the Azerbaijan SSR, Sadig Murtuzayev, who in 1982 read an article about the Museum of Bread in the German city of Ulm in the "Izvestiya" newspaper. It was decided to create a Museum in the building of an old mill. The restoration work was carried out by local specialists. The main facade of the building was decorated with stone shebeke and two huge mosaic panels almost two floors high. The idea of the mosaic belonged to Sadig Murtuzayev, and it was made by the Aghdam artist-designer Zakir Rustamov. The panel was assembled using special colored stones.

On 25 November 1983, the museum received its first visitors. The museum consisted of three main sections.

The area of the first exhibition hall was 80 square meters, the second - 30. The first hall housed a mechanical mill capable of grinding 8-10 tons of grain per day. It also exhibited a used, in the 1930s, Trier machine for separating the grain from impurities. The second exhibition hall was also abounded with interesting exhibits: tools of labor - a plow, a threshing board, a knife, a sickle, a threshing machine - "charchar" books, manuscripts and various materials testifying the development of the agricultural tools for grain growing and farming. On the wooden stairs to the right of the mill it was possible to climb to the second tier. In addition, a jug and kitchen utensils were displayed in the lower hall. The exhibits in the next hall were exclusively related to grain growing and agriculture. Various types of wheat, grains of different varieties, bread cards issued to children during the war, as well as a map of Azerbaijan made from wheat grains were exhibited here too.

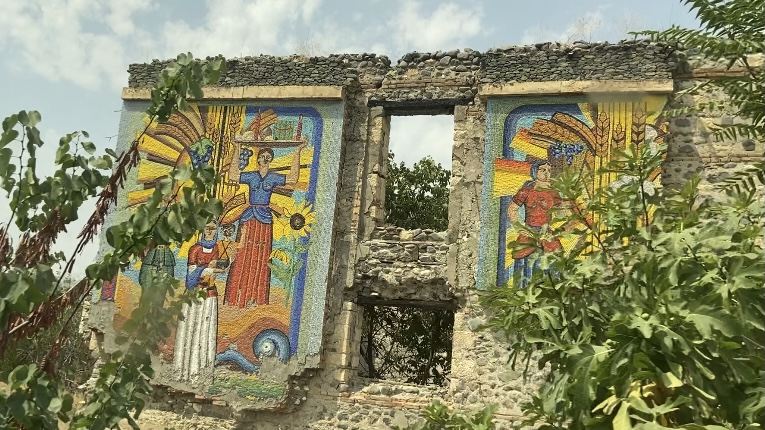
Museum after Armenian control.

As a result of the attacks of the Armenian armed forces during the First Karabakh War, shells hit the museum twice. The first shell hit the third exhibition hall, but it did not explode. The second shell hit the museum on 12 August 1992, around 16:40. On this day, the city of Aghdam was subjected to a powerful rocket and artillery fire from the villages of Khanabad and Nakhchivanik of the Askeran district, due to which one of the rockets hit the Bread Museum.

== Exhibits ==
The Museum exhibited more than 300 samples of bread baked in the capitals of the republics of the former USSR. The Academician Imam Mustafayev, Doctor of Economic Sciences, the Professor Abulfaz Gasimov and many other representatives of the intelligentsia played an exceptional role in creating the exhibit fund of the museum. During those years, the museum collected samples of bread from all regions of the Azerbaijan SSR. 16 ancient agricultural implements from the Gadabay district were transferred to the exhibition fund of the museum. Of a great value were the samples of bread that had been into space and then sent to the museum from Moscow's Star City.

Of a greatest interest, there was the most ancient exhibit of the museum - petrified wheat grains of the 7th millennium BC. These grains, discovered during the excavations on the Chalagan-tepe hill in the Aghdam village of Efetli, thanks to the efforts of the famous archaeologist Ideal Narimanov, were transferred to the museum by the academician, the breeder scientist Imam Mustafayev, the creator of the durum wheat. Subsequently, when Aghdam was under the threat of imminent occupation by the armed forces of Armenia, some exhibits were taken out of the museum, including these ancient petrified wheat grains. They were handed over by the head of the Department of Culture, Chimnaz Aliyeva, to the State Museum of History of Azerbaijan in Baku.

As an exhibit, the Museum of Bread was also given a chaise, with which the local chaise maker Bakhman participated in all the festivities held in the 1980s in Aghdam.

Some of the exhibits were donated to the museum by guests. So, Galina Andreevna Kanaeva, a baker by profession, who survived the siege of Leningrad, presented the museum with the “siege bread”. This was a small 125-gram ration, which was issued during the World War II during the blockade. Kanaeva kept this bread in the memory of those days. Having seen a TV show about the Bread Museum, she came to Aghdam and donated this bread ration to the museum.

Another interesting exhibit was the hand-made millstones of the 17th century (Kir-kire). They were presented to the museum by the 87-year-old Ismayil Gafar oglu Mammadov from the village of Aghamaly.

== Museum staff ==
The first director of the museum was the journalist Allahverdi Asadov. On 1 September 1984, this post was taken by Niyazi Guliyev, the editor of the AzTV department. He did not work for long leaving his post for health reasons. Then the head of the district branch of the society "Bilik" ("Knowledge") Ofeliya Zeynalova was appointed as director, later Hafiz Aliyev was. Two scientists, three guides and a miller worked at the museum. The purpose of establishing a miller's staff unit was to keep the mill in working condition in order to be able to present the finished products to guests.

== In culture ==
In 2013, AzDimension, an Azerbaijani company, released the video game "Under Occupation: Aghdam", from the shooter's first-person, in which one can find the Bread Museum.
