= Jafargulu agha Javanshir =

Azerbaijani poet and major-general of the Russian Army

- Heir of Karabakh Khanate
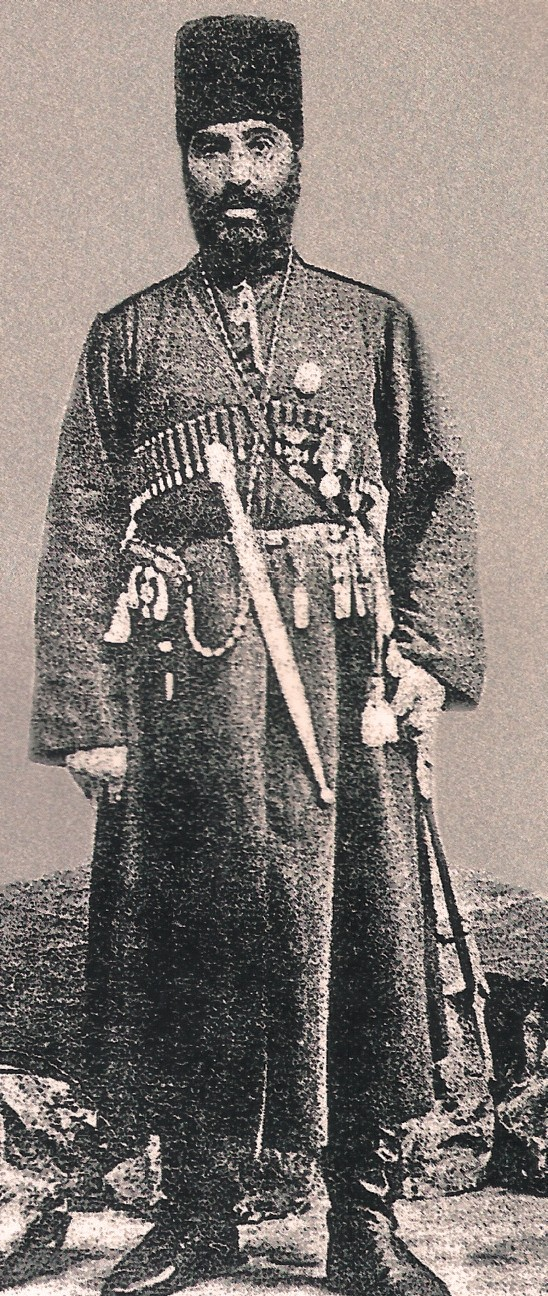
- Other names: Neva, Arif
- Born: c. 1782; Shusha, Karabakh Khanate
- Died: December 15, 1866 (aged 83–84); Shusha, Shusha uezd, Elizavetpol Governorate, Russian Empire
- Buried: Imarat cemetery
- Wars and battles: Russo-Persian War (1804–1813)
- Noble family: Javanshir clan
- Spouse: 2
- Father: Mammad Hasan agha Javanshir
- Mother: Khayrunnisa begüm
- Occupation: Poet, public figure, nobility

Jafargulu agha Javanshir (Azerbaijani: Cəfərqulu ağa Məhəmmədhəsən ağa oğlu Sarıcalı-Cavanşir; 1782 or 1787–1866), also known as Jafar khan Javanshir (Azerbaijani: Cəfər xan Cavanşir) or by his pen-name Neva (Azerbaijani: Nəva, lit. 'Harmony'), was an Azerbaijani poet, warlord and major general of the Russian Army.

== Early life ==
Jafargulu was born either in 1782/3 or in 1787, in Shusha. He was the elder son of Mammadhasan agha Javanshir - heir of Ibrahimkhalil khan of Karabakh - by Khayrunnisa begüm of Ganja.

After his father's death on 1 December [O.S. 19 November] 1805, he inherited all properties (about 36 villages), as well as leadership of his maternal clan of Jabrayillu and received the recognition as heir. He allied with Russian Empire under the orders of his grandfather during the 1804–1813 Russo-Persian War against the Kurdish tribesmen of Karadagh.

Dmitry Lisanevich, the Russian lieutenant-colonel who killed his grandfather in 1806, mentioned Jafargulu as one of the informants of treason of his father, the khan and even claimed that Russian troops used Jafargulu's house as meeting point. Just a day after the assassination, Jafargulu rode with Lisanevich and defeated Iranian troops near Shusha. He led a combined contingent of 250 Azerbaijani cavalry and 200 Armenian infantrymen of Karabakh together with Lisanevich on 28 June [O.S. 16 June] 1806 against the Iranian army led by his uncle Abul-Fath Khan Javanshir and routed them near Zangezur up till Ordubad 4 days later.

== Struggle for heirship ==
He arrived in Tiflis around 18 October [O.S. 6 October] 1806 to put forward his claim as principal heir of his grandfather in opposition to his uncle Mehdigulu Khan who was appointed as the Khan of Karabakh by General Ivan Gudovich 25 September. The claim was based on prior Russo-Karabakhi understanding of primogeniture succession. Although he failed to achieve this target, to compensate him, Alexander I promoted Jafargulu to colonel rank on suggestion of Gudovich with two medallions - one originally intended for his father and one for his brave in battles against Iranian army on 14 January [O.S. 2 January] 1807.

However, after 4 years, in November 1811 an Iranian courier was apprehended by Russian guards who was bringing a letter to Jafargulu from Abbas Mirza, promising him the title of hakim in return of allegiance to Iran, as well as ordering Jabrayillu clan to obey him. This correspondence prompted viceroy Filippo Paulucci to order his arrest, as well as tribal leaders of Jabrayillu. However, he escaped near Terter and crossed the Araz river to Iran. Although in his later letters to Paulucci he insisted on being set up by Iranian side, his uncle Mehdigulu accused him of treason and blamed losing 60 soldiers on him.

Nevertheless, Iranian army defeated Russian regiments in February 1812, captured 5000-6000 families and installed Jafargulu as khan over them in Karadagh, a bordering region with Karabakh. Not happy with his situation, he appealed to Nikolay Rtishchev, new viceroy of Caucasus, through his mother to be granted amnesty and return to Karabakh. This was only realized after Treaty of Gulistan signed on 24 October 1813. Rtishchev also tried to mend broken relations between Mehdigulu and Jafargulu - he officially acknowledged Jafargulu as an heir to his uncle on 29 March [O.S. 17 March] 1815, while ordering him to acknowledge Mehdigulu as rightful khan of Karabakh. Mehdigulu, who had no son of his own, had to accept.

However, this promise was not honored by Rtishchev's successor Aleksey Yermolov, who in his report to Alexander I urged for the need to dissolution of khanates of Karabakh and Shaki, adding that he would find "plausible reasons to keep him away from the throne". Nevertheless Jafargulu continued to take part in military campaigns, especially during Yermolov's Dagestan campaign in 1819, for which he received a Gold Saber encrusted with precious stones and an inscription “For Bravery” on 3 March [O.S. 20 February] 1820.

However, the relations between his uncle and him continued to detoriate in 1821. Jafargulu was assaulted near his home in Shusha, receiving two gunshots, but managed to hide. Jafargulu accused his uncle, who on 3 December [O.S. 21 November] 1822, fearing Russia's punishment for the overtures had made to the Iranian government, escaped to Iran. According to Yermolov's memoirs, Jafargulu orchestrated this attack on himself to sideline Mehdigulu and gain khanate of Karabakh. This was repeated by Nikolay Muravyov-Karsky, who in his memoirs said that Valerian Madatov urged Jafargulu to shot himself in the arm.

Using the opportunity, Yermolov abolished the Karabakh khanate and it became a province of Russia. Yermolov later arrested Jafargulu and took his 15-year-old son Karim agha as hostage in Tiflis, arguing that he didn't trust him given his previous defection to Iran. Moreover, Jafargulu was exiled to Simbirsk 2 weeks later. Nikolay Muravyov-Karsky who accompanied him during the journey, mentioned that he "was very worried about his future and kept asking me where he was being taken."

== Life in Russia ==
He started to live in Simbirsk by March 1823 with his son and provided with annual pension. Later in 1825, using the opportunity of Alexander I's visit to Simbirsk, he managed to get audience and file a complaint. Thanks to this, he managed to move to Saint Petersburg, where he became a member of English Club as well. He filed a second complaint in 1826, to his successor Nicholas I, which was successful. In his letter to Nicholas in June 1827, he accused Valerian Madatov of orchestrating a conspiracy towards him, robbing his family of their estates. He accepted to let go of his claims to khanate in return of reunion with his family.

Nicholas however, ordered to ask new viceroy Ivan Paskevich's opinion about this. According to Foreign Affairs Minister of the Russian Empire Karl Nesselrode "Jafargulu was brave and courageous, for he received the rank of colonel and a gold saber adorned with diamonds for distinction in battles; but before that he fought against us for the Persians with equal courage." According to Vasily Potto, Paskevich found Jafargulu's return uncomfortable; he believed that the presence in one place of two blood enemies, a nephew and an uncle (Mehdigulu returned from Iran in 1827), could become a cause of confusion for an entire province. Nikolay Muravyov-Karsky on the other hand, reported that there was no harm Jafargulu can do to the state, but there was no benefit either.

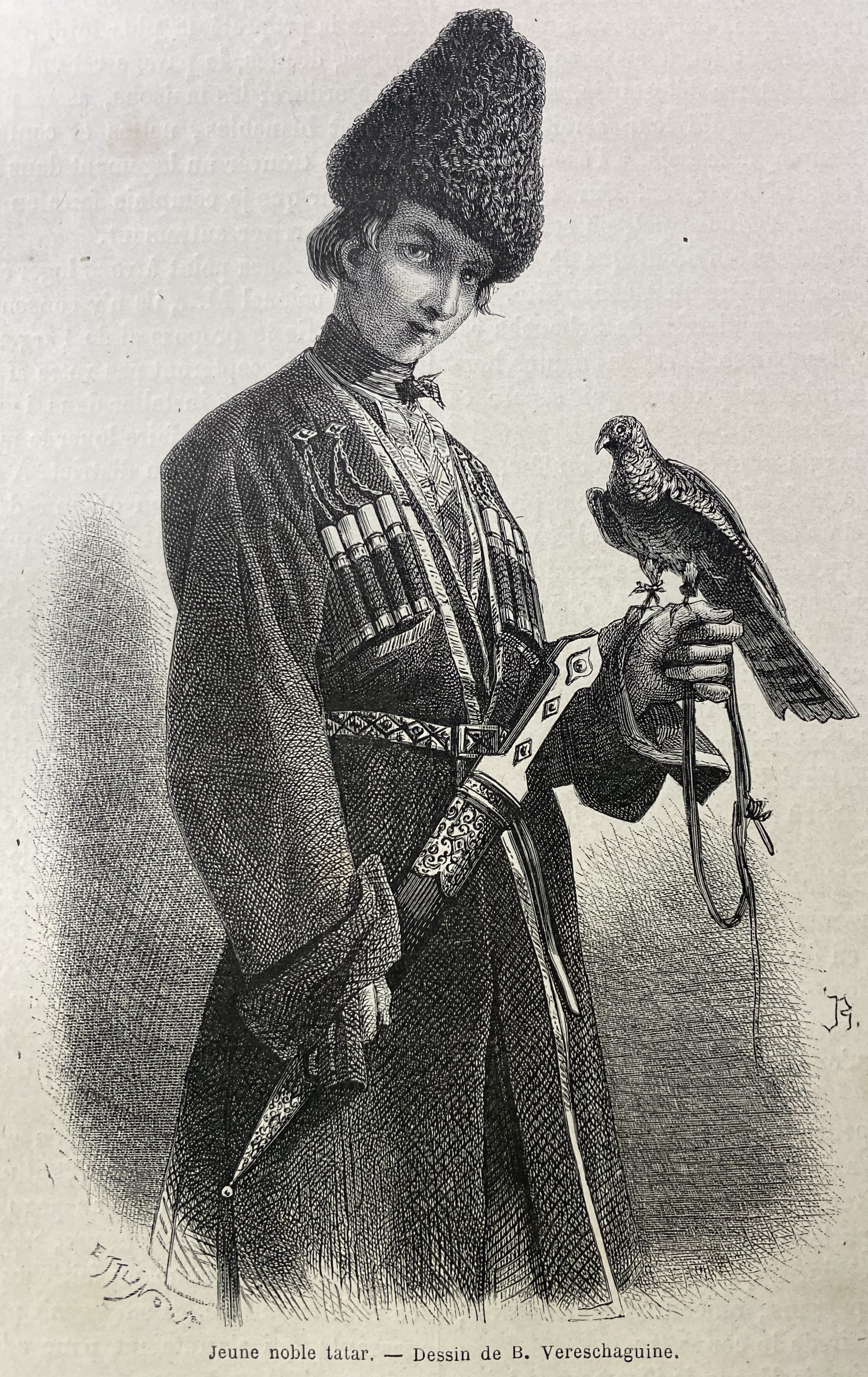
Possibly Jafargulu's son Hidayat agha drawn by Vasily Vereshchagin, Shusha, 1865

== Later years ==
He was only granted to return to Karabakh 1830, following Treaty of Turkmenchay. He was promoted to major-general on 18 December [O.S. 6 December] 1850 as part of 1st Caucasus Army Corps. He was a founding member of Caucasian Society of Agriculture same year. Between 1852-1853 he was honorary supervisor of the Shamakhi District School.

Andrey Fadeyev, ex-governor of Saratov Governorate visited him in 1848 and described him as living in European style home. According to Potto, one of the travelers, who saw Jafargulu in 1857, says that he was already a venerable old man, but that even then his handsome, typical face, set off by a full beard, and a colossal figure, bent over years, but saying that there was before a lot of life and strength. The gravity of his calm movements, his posture and height - everything distinguished him from the crowd of honorary beys, also tall and prominent people, who also did not look like ordinary Azerbaijanis.

August von Haxthausen visited Jafargulu and Mirza Jamal Javanshir between 1850-1853 in Shusha, at his home together with Emanuel von Aderkas. He was surprised to hear an overture from La muette de Portici from his clock. He described Jafargulu as "handsome, tall, and well-built man with a noble and very attractive face."

Last famous person to visit Jafargulu was Vasily Vereshchagin, who saw him in 1864. According to him, Jafargulu was breeding Karabakh horses and even created his own breed called Jabrayil horses, which were much stronger and durable, albeit not as beautiful as them. He described Jafargulu as "an old man with an intelligent and expressive face; his long red beard reached his chest. Bedridden for a long time, he was a shadow of the brave Jafar of the past. He had been one of the contenders to the Karabakh throne, but his bravery, courage, and determination had made him too dangerous—he spent many years in exile. A handsome, young, and rich man, he had been very popular in fashionable Petersburg society where he lived a dissipated life. Today, he probably tries to atone for his past sins with good deeds."

Jafargulu died on 15 December [O.S. 3 December] 1866 and was buried in Imarat cemetery.

== Poetry ==
Jafargulu Agha wrote poems under the pseudonym “Neva" meaning "Harmony," though Mir Mohsun Navvab claimed him to also have used the name "Arif." He wrote in both Persian and Azerbaijani languages, but never in Russian, though he knew it well beyond fluency. Much of his poetry is polemical: his relative and early friend Gasim bey Zakir was especially critical of him during later life and dedicated a series of poems to him:

Azerbaijani original	English translation
Çoxların qılıbsan çörәyә möhtac Axtarır, tapılmaz dәrdinә әlac; Fironu Hamanü Zöhhakü Hәccac; Ola bilmәz ola sitәmkar sәndәn.	Many have no Bread due to you For your sickness there's no cure; Pharaoh, Haman, Zahhak, Hajjaj; Couldn't be more cruel than you.

To which he responded mockingly:

Azerbaijani original	English translation
Mən deyiləm, aləmdə var, eldə var Belə, cüzvü işlər aradə gedər: Burada bir başmaq olub zərərin Qələm alıb yazdın zəmin bu dərin.	It's not me, the world is cruel Truly, such trifles come and go; Here you come and lose a loafer Take your pen and write your tale.

Rivalry between two poets grew especially worse following Mehdigulu's death in 1845 and Jafargulu's wish to marry his widow Badir Jahan Begüm and cousin Khurshidbanu Natavan to his son Hidayat agha (1821–1888). Zakir further accused him of overtaxing people, causing poverty in Karabakh. Hatred worsened when Zakir's son-in-law Ali bey Fuladov was forced to pay 10-fold of the debt he owed to Jafargulu. Events culminated when Jafargulu raided Zakir's village Khindiristan with 700 soldiers in name of searching for Zakir's fugitive nephew Behbud, arresting his 23-year-old son Najafgulu and 20-year-old nephew Iskander in addition to his 19 relatives. Zakir's other nephew was shot dead, while Zakir himself was forced to be exiled to Baku.

His other critics included Muhammad agha Mujtahidzadeh and Ashiq Peri. The latter was from Maralyan village - owned by Jafargulu - and criticized his immoral behaviour and overall general character.

== Personality ==
He enjoyed Popular support, with about 700 soldiers always in his infantry – when critique of him or the Karabakh Khanate was raised, he would sometimes lead them in looting and raiding the city or village where it came from. He was frequently described as being extremely tall, towering over most of the Imperial Russian Army, and was said to have had reddish hair.

Much of his poetry consists of attacks against other aristocrats, especially Islamic judges, but also features him lamenting death and the decline of the Karabakh Khanate, as well as self-praise in which he compares his kingship to that of Jamshid, and his ideals to those of Plato, as well some flirtatious exchanges with Ashiq Peri. He also wrote many Meykhana-like Ghazals.

== Contemporary views ==
He is sometimes painted as a Philanthropist by Historians for having used his wealth to open many Zurkhanas and Meykhanas, as well as sponsoring many now-beloved Azerbaijani national poets, and having held many friendships and close ties with commonfolk and Infantrymen.

== Family ==
His descendants carry the surname Javanshirov; after death of his uncle, he became head of Javanshir clan and head of senior line of the dynasty. He had two wives:

1. Ajaibnisa khanum (daughter of Tuni bey from Banazur, an Armenian)
  - Abdullapasha agha (1803/4 – before 1860) married his own cousin Gullü begüm (daughter of Khanjan agha, his uncle), had 5 daughters
  - Karim agha (c. 1807 – c. 1852) — Major in Imperial Russian Army, also known as Prince Javanshir, he was the only member of the family of the Karabakh khans who had an official title of "knyaz"
2. Yetar khanim (daughter of Huseyngulu beg).
  - Hidayat agha (1821/2 – c. 1888) married Sharafjahan begüm (b. 1836), daughter of Abra Khan (son of Jafarqoli khan Donboli) and Azad Begüm (daughter of Ibrahimkhalil khan)
    1. Javad agha (17 August [O.S. 5 August] 1851 - December 1930) married Saray Malek Qajar (1868–1942), daughter of Rzagulu Qajar (1837–1894)
    2. Huseyn agha (1854-?) - had two sons and a daughter
    3. Najafgulu agha (1858-?) - had five sons and one daughter
    4. Begüm khanum (1858-20 December 1910)
    5. Aghabegüm agha (1865-?)

== Awards ==
- Gold Saber encrusted with precious stones and an inscription “For Bravery” (3 March [O.S. 20 February] 1820)
- Order of St. Anna 2nd class (30 October [O.S. 18 October] 1848)
- Order of St. Vladimir 3rd class for Non-Christians (18 December [O.S. 6 December] 1850)
- Order of St. Stanislav 1st class (30 May [O.S. 18 May] 1861)

== Sources ==
- Berge, Adolf (1866–1904), Акты, собранные Кавказской археографической комиссией [Acts collected by the Caucasian Archaeographic Commission] (in Russian), Saint Petersburg
- Bournoutian, George A. (1997). "EBRĀHĪM ḴALĪL KHAN JAVĀNŠĪR". Encyclopaedia Iranica, Vol. VIII, Fasc. 1. pp. 71–73.
