= Shahbulag Mosque =

Former mosque in Papravənd, Aghdam, Azerbaijan

- Azerbaijani: Şahbulaq məscidi Persian: مسجد شاهبلاغ
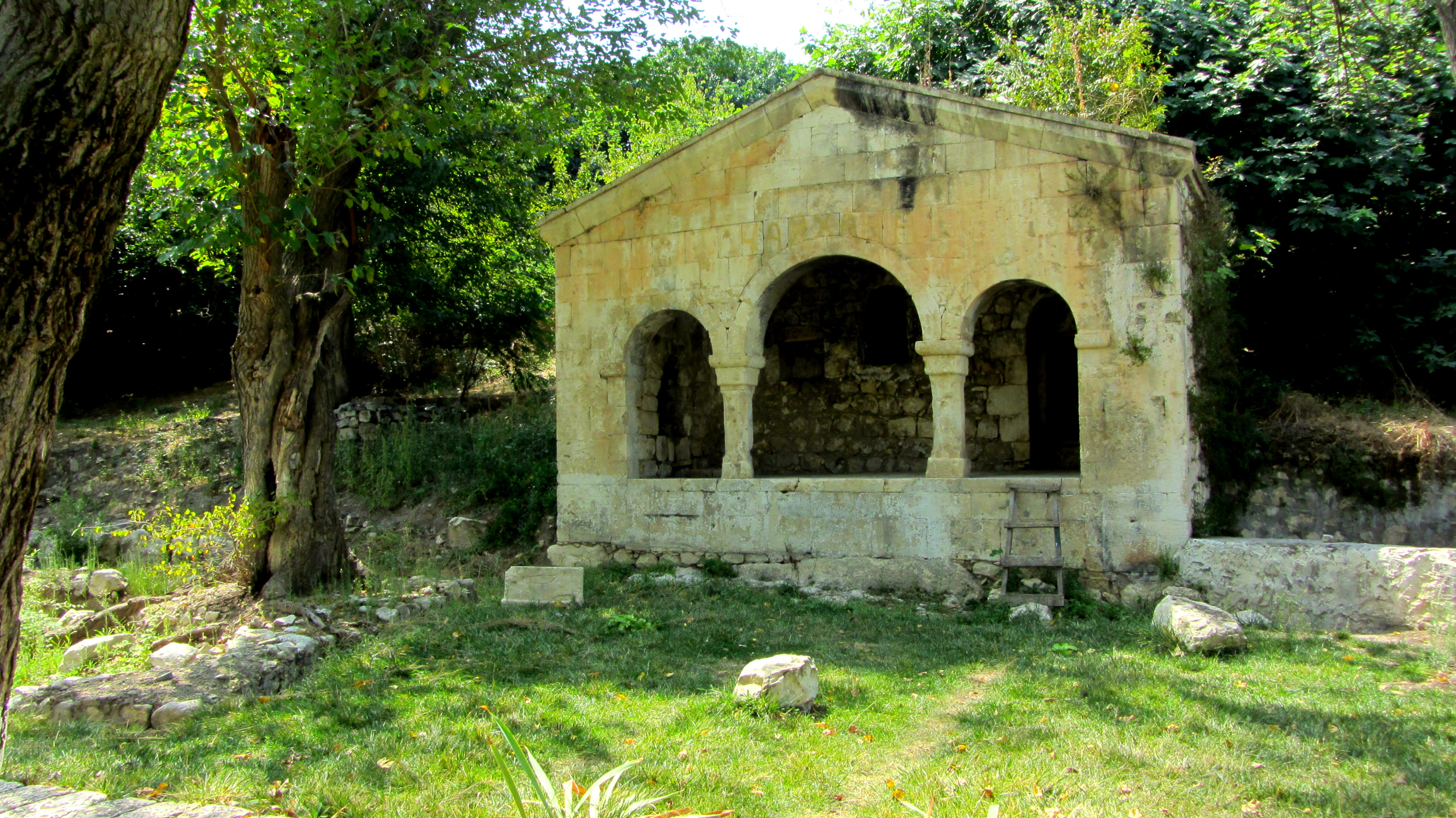
- The former mosque in 2016

- Location of the former mosque in Azerbaijan

Religion
- Affiliation: Islam (former)
- Ecclesiastical or organizational status: Mosque (1752–1928); Profane use (1928–1991)
- Status: Abandoned (ruinous state)

Location
- Location: Papravənd, Aghdam, Karabakh
- Country: Azerbaijan
- Interactive map of Shahbulag Mosque
- Coordinates: 40°03′57″N 46°54′14″E

Architecture
- Architect: Karbalayi Safikhan Karabakhi
- Type: Mosque architecture
- Funded by: Panah Ali Khan
- Groundbreaking: 1751
- Completed: 1752

Specifications
- Length: 7.18 m (23.6 ft)
- Width: 9.38 m (30.8 ft)
- Height (max): 5.4 m (18 ft)
- Materials: Limestone

The Shahbulag Mosque (Azerbaijani: Şahbulaq məscidi, Persian: مسجد شاهبلاغ) is a former mosque and historical architectural monument, located in the area called Shahbulag, in the village of Papravənd, in the Agdam region of Azerbaijan. The mosque was built by order of Karabakh Khan Panah Ali Khan in 1751–1752.

== Structure ==
The Shahbulag Mosque is built entirely from local limestone, and consists of three arched balconies and a worship hall. The balconies are supported by a pair of stone columns. The ceiling is completed in the form of arcade. As the worship hall is square, the ceiling has the form of a dome from the interior, and on the outside the roof is made up of two slopes with the addition of new coating materials. This was created to make favorable conditions for the immediate flow of natural waters.

The total wall thickness of the mosque reaches 1 m (3 ft 3 in). The plan dimensions of the mosque is 9.38 m × 7.18 m (30.8 ft × 23.6 ft). As the mosque is built on the sloping ground, its distance from the rear to the roof is 4.37 m (14.3 ft) and from the front façade to 5.4 m (18 ft).

Despite the fact that the Shahbulag Mosque is architecturally simple, it is an example of architect Karbalayi Safikhan Karabakhi's creativity, seen in numerous mosques in Karabakh.

== See also ==
- Islam in Azerbaijan
- List of mosques in Azerbaijan
- Shahbulag Castle
