= Agdam Mosque =

Mosque in Aghdam, Azerbaijan

Aghdam Mosque
- Ağdam məscidi
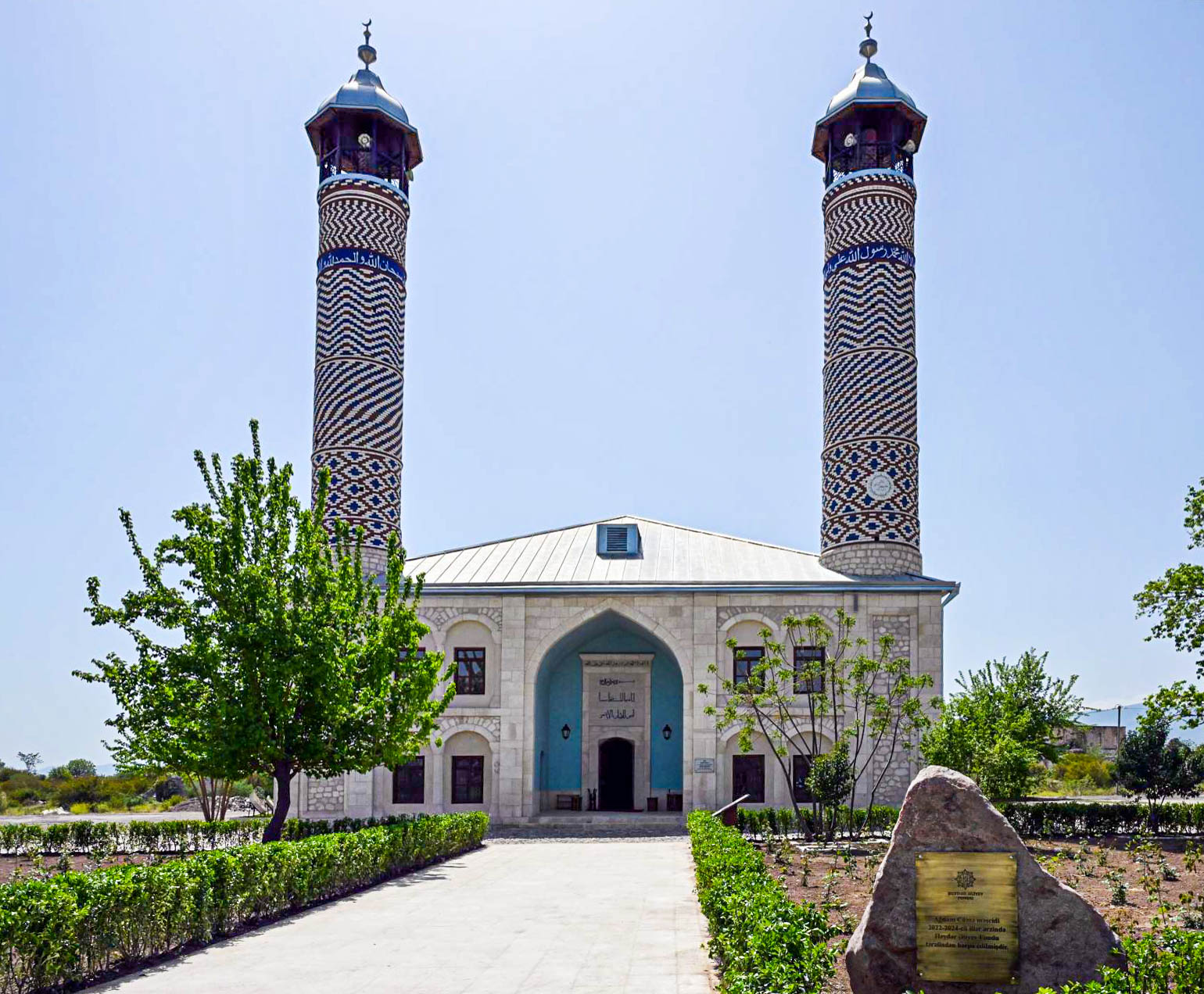
- The mosque in 2024, after restoration

- Location of the mosque in Azerbaijan

Religion
- Affiliation: Shia Islam
- Ecclesiastical or organisational status: Mosque (1870–c. 1990s); Profane use (c. 1990s–2020); Mosque (since 2022)
- Status: Active (restored)

Location
- Location: Aghdam
- Country: Azerbaijan
- Coordinates: 39°59′N 46°56′E

Architecture
- Architect: Karbalayi Safikhan Karabakhi
- Type: Mosque architecture
- Style: Islamic; Azerbaijani
- Groundbreaking: c. 1868
- Completed: c. 1870

Specifications
- Dome: 9 (maybe more)
- Minaret: 2
- Materials: Brick; iron; marble; timber

The Aghdam Mosque (Azerbaijani: Ağdam məscidi) or Juma Mosque (Azerbaijani: Cümə məscidi) is a Shia mosque, located in the ghost town of Aghdam, Azerbaijan. Completed in the 1870s, the mosque was desecrated during the First Nagorno-Karabakh War and restored following the Second Nagorno-Karabakh War.

== History ==
=== Construction ===
The mosque was built by the architect Karbalayi Safikhan Karabakhi from 1868 to 1870, in the typical style for mosques in the Karabakh region, which included the division of stone columns on the two-story gallery and the use of domed ceilings. Other mosques in this style include Barda Mosque, the Yukhari Govhar Agha Mosque in Shusha, a mosque in the city of Fuzuli and one in the village of Horadiz.

=== Armenian occupation ===
During the First Nagorno-Karabakh War, Aghdam was used by Azerbaijani forces during the Siege of Stepanakert to fire BM-21 Grad long-range missiles at the Armenian populace. Aghdam later came under the control of Armenian forces. After the capture, according to eyewitnesses, the city was plundered, destroyed and burned. The Aghdam Mosque, the only building left standing in Aghdam, has been vandalized with graffiti and used as a stable for cattle and swine. A narrative of "barbarous Armenians who turn mosques into pigsties" would become an important component of mobilization in Azerbaijan in the prelude to the 2020 Nagorno-Karabakh war.

In 2009, the Republic of Artsakh began funding measures to preserve Islamic monuments. According to Artsakh officials the surroundings of the Aghdam Mosque were cleaned from the rubble and fenced in 2010. The RFE/RL journalist Stepan Lohr, who visited Agdam in 2011, posted photos of the mosque with no roof, and what he described as "the neglected and damaged interior of Aghdam's once-glorious mosque". A satellite investigation conducted by the Caucasus Heritage Watch of Cornell University found that between 1977 and 2019, the structure and shape of the mosque remained unchanged. Since 1992, the mosque sustained minor damage under Armenian control, with only the modern roofing installed during Soviet times being removed.

=== After the Second Nagorno-Karabakh war ===
Following Azerbaijan's victory in the Second Nagorno-Karabakh War, it regained the district of Aghdam through the 2020 Nagorno-Karabakh ceasefire agreement on 20 November 2020. Three days later, president Ilham Aliyev and first lady Mehriban Aliyeva visited the ruins of the city and the Aghdam Mosque. Aliyev gifted a Quran from Mecca to the mosque. In 2020, after the ceding of Aghdam back to Azerbaijan, the first Friday prayer in 28 years was held in the mosque by the last imam of the mosque and Azerbaijani soldiers. Restoration of the mosque commenced in 2022, funded with the support of the Heydar Aliyev Foundation.

== Gallery ==
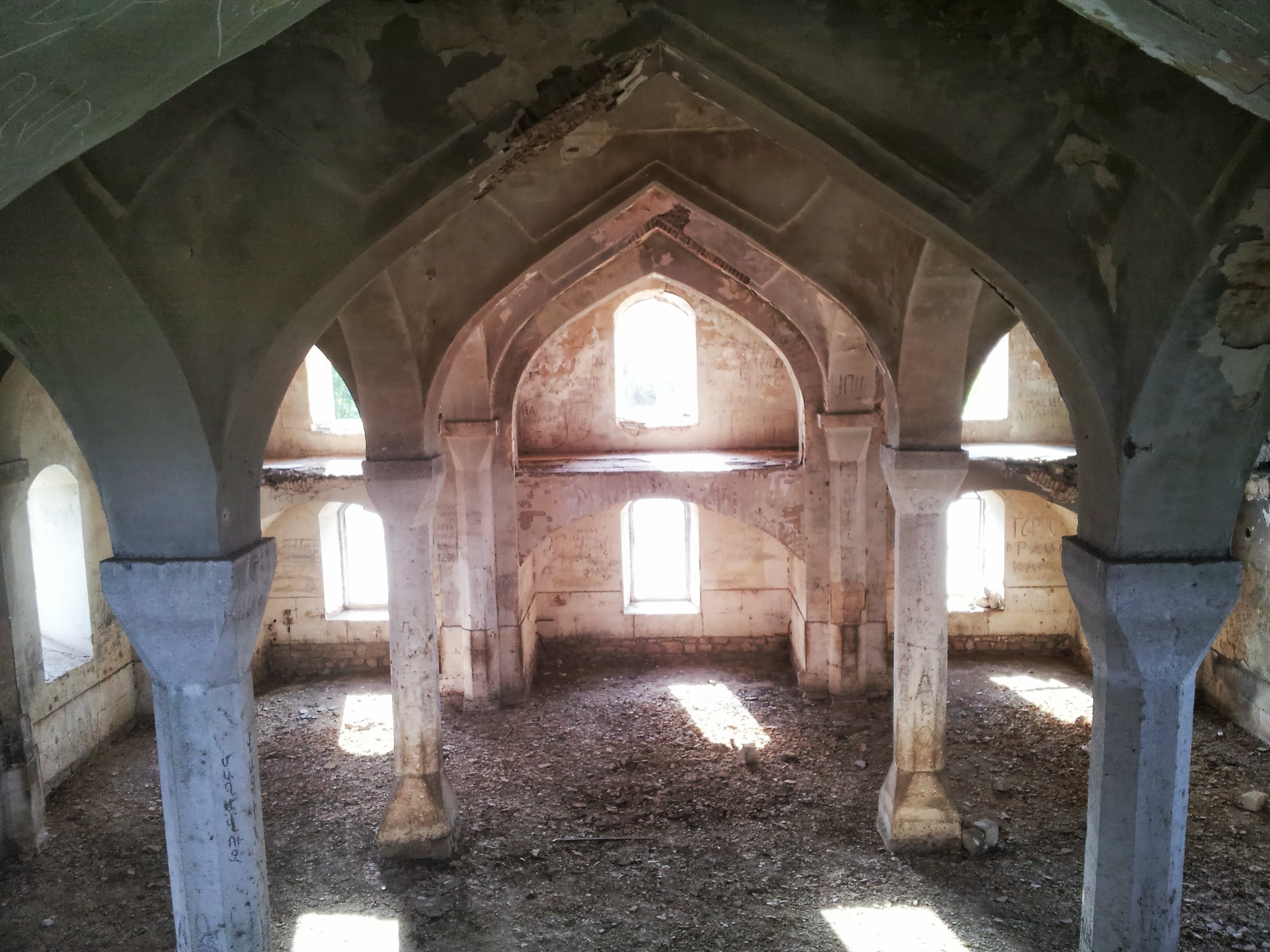
Interior of the mosque in 2000

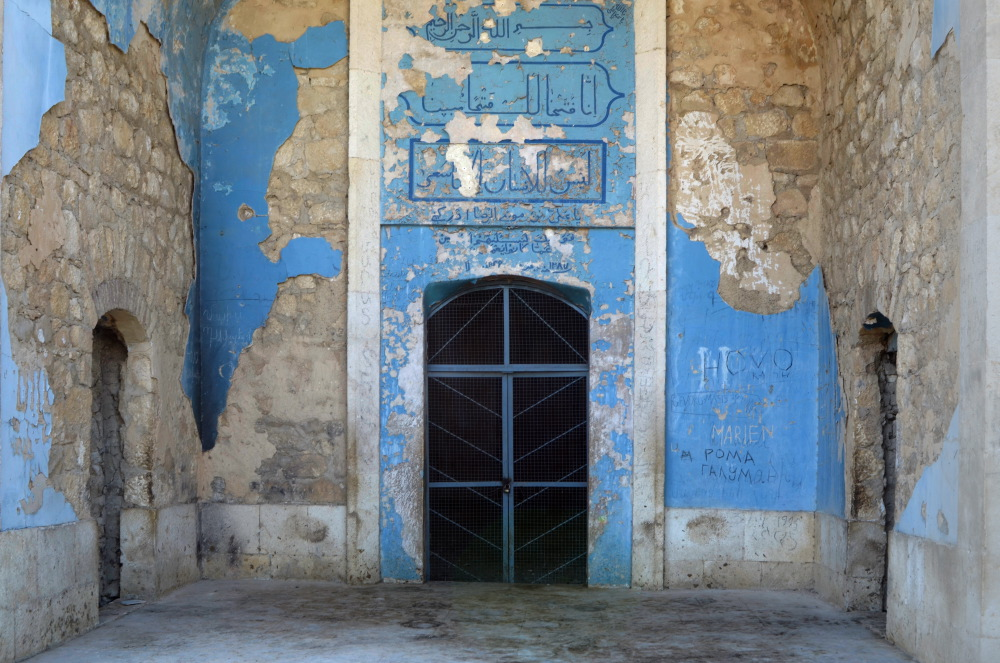
Entrance of the mosque in 2013

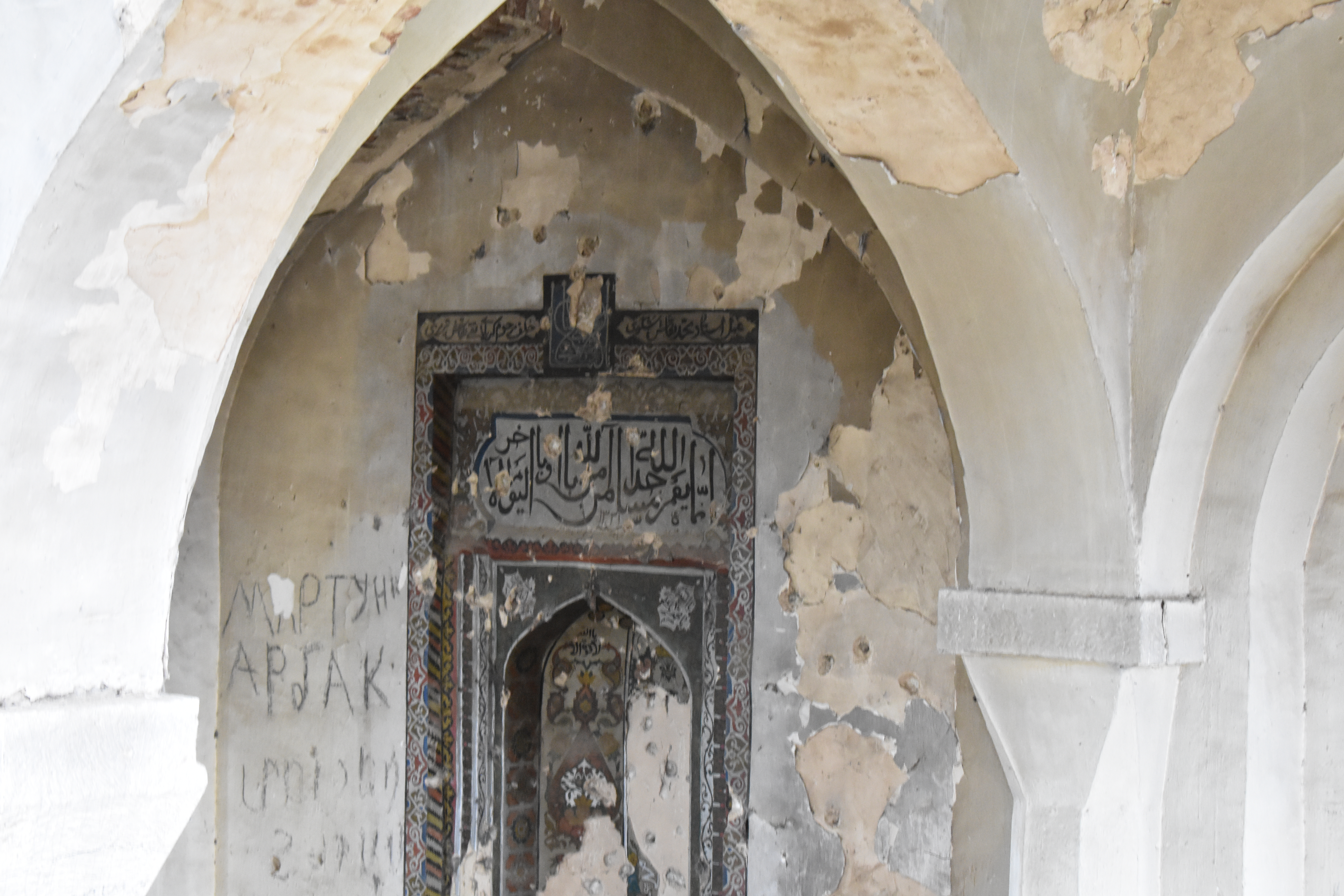
Mihrab of the mosque in 2018

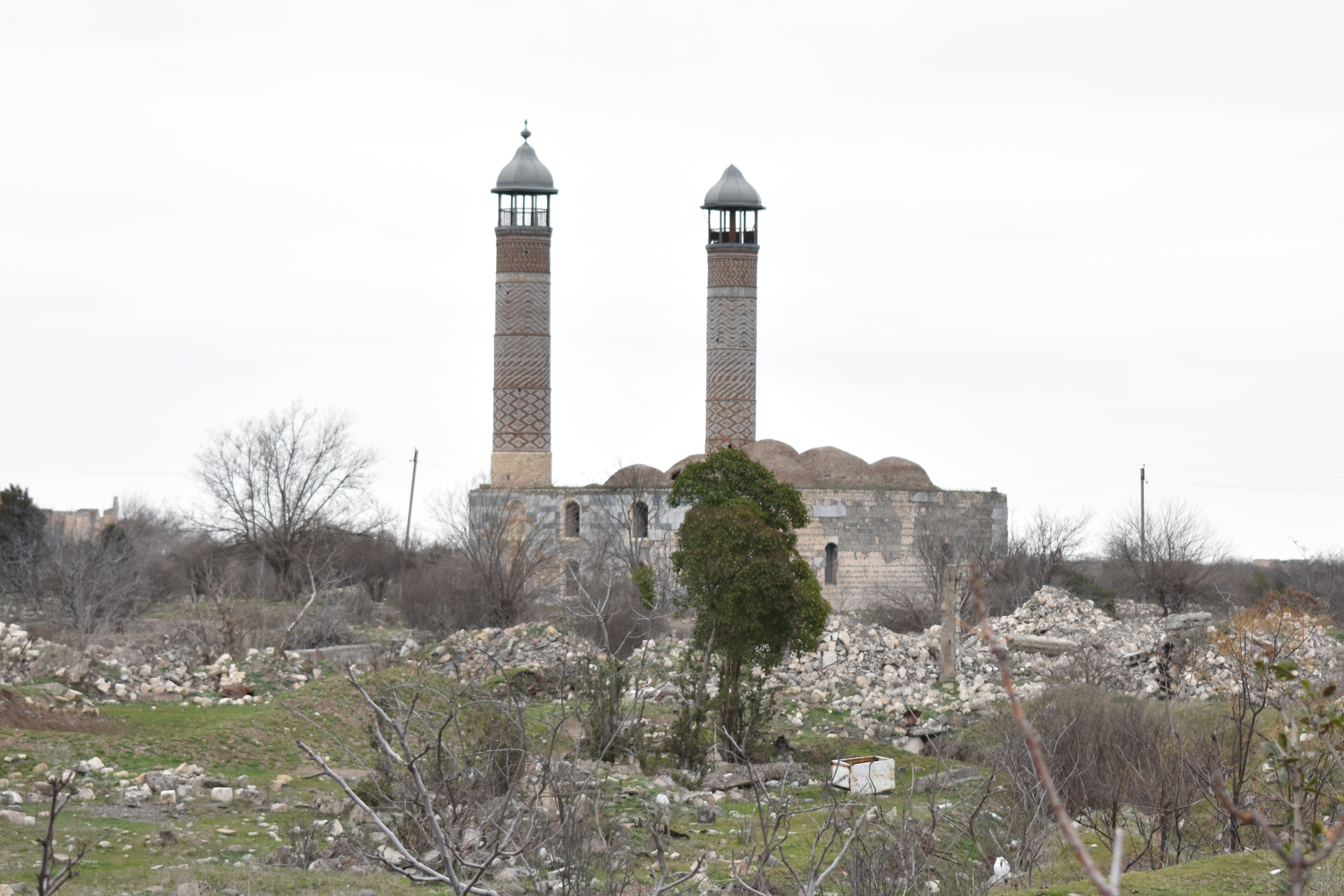
General view and surrounding landscape in 2018

== See also ==
- Islam in Azerbaijan
- List of mosques in Azerbaijan
- Culture of Azerbaijan
