= Imarat Stadium =

Stadium in Azerbaijan

Coordinates: 39.9928°N 46.94°E

İmarət Stadium
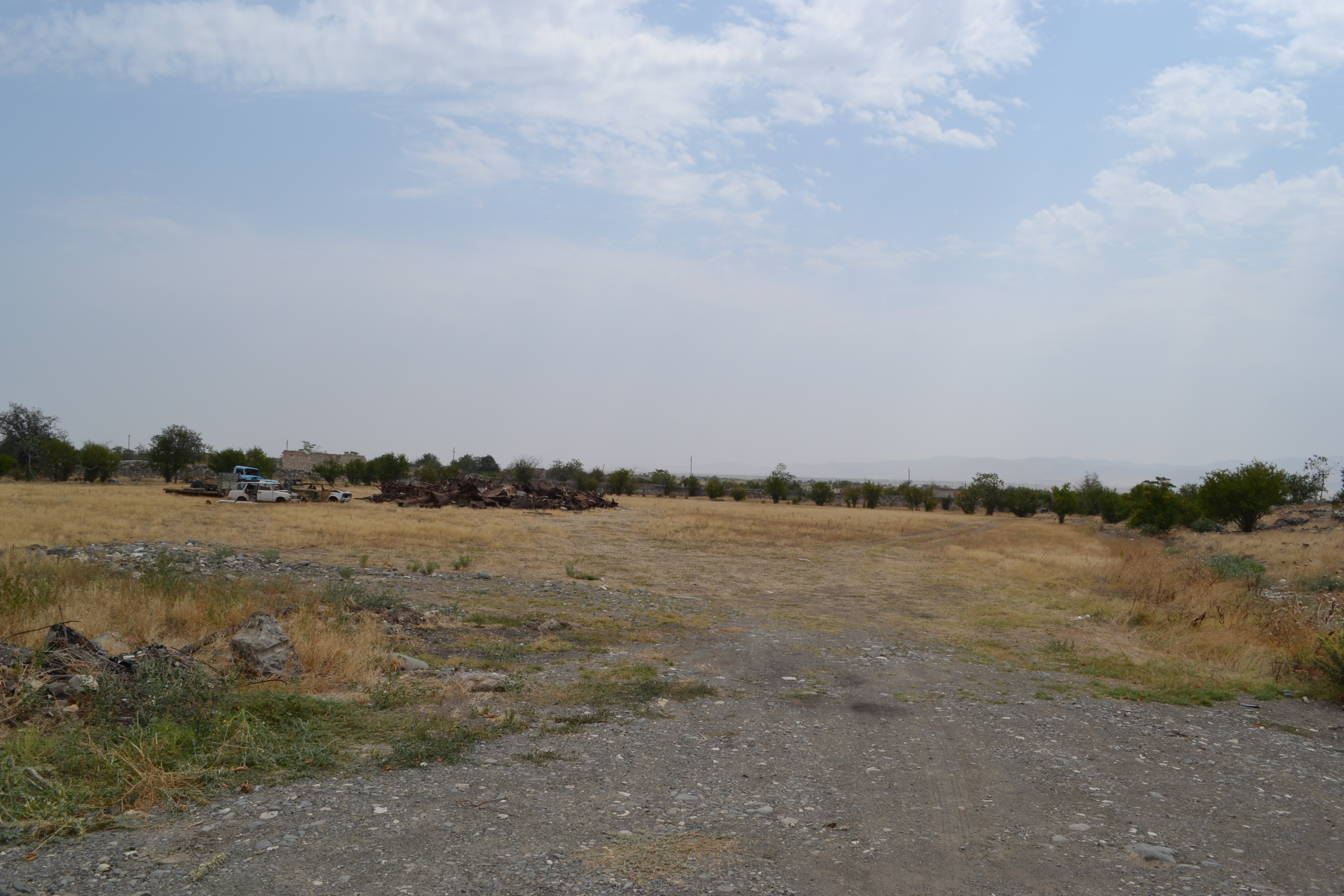
- Ruins of the stadium, August 2021
- Interactive map of İmarət Stadium
- Location: Aghdam, Azerbaijan
- Surface: Grass

Construction
- Opened: 1952
- Demolished: June 1993

Tenant
- Qarabağ FK

Imarat Stadium (Azerbaijani: İmarət stadionu), opened in 1952, was a multi-purpose stadium in Aghdam, Azerbaijan. The stadium was built in 1952 and used as home stadium by Qarabağ FK. The stadium was destroyed by bombardments from Armenian military forces during the First Nagorno-Karabakh War in June 1993.

The stadium returned to Azerbaijani control on 20 November 2020 as a result of the 2020 Nagorno-Karabakh war. Following its liberation, Azerbaijani forces began to clear mines from the stadium grounds. The Ministry of Youth and Sports of Azerbaijan has declared that the stadium will be restored. On September 19, 2024, the foundation of the new Imarat stadium was laid by President Ilham Aliyev, and the construction of the stadium is expected to be completed in 2026.

Qarabağ FK's biggest fan club, Imarat Tayfa, was also named after this stadium.

== New stadium ==
During his visit to Aghdam, Azerbaijani President Ilham Aliyev stated that the Imarat Stadium, which had been destroyed by Armenians, would be restored and that the stadium would retain the name "Imarat": "Work has already begun on the restoration of the Imarat complex. Its name will be "Imarat". But we will also restore Imarat anew because it was originally intended as a jidir (horse racing venue), so we will restore it in its original jidir form."

In the "First State Program on the Great Return to the Liberated Territories of the Republic of Azerbaijan," approved by President Ilham Aliyev's decree on November 16, 2022, it was planned to start the construction of the stadium in 2023 and complete it by 2026.

On September 19, 2024, the foundation of the Imarat Stadium was laid by President Ilham Aliyev. A 19.2-hectare plot of land has been allocated for the new stadium. It is planned to be built in accordance with UEFA's 4th category requirements and will have a seating capacity of 11,700 spectators.
