= Imarat cemetery =

Cemetery in Aghdam, Azerbaijan

- Azerbaijani: İmarət qəbristanlığı
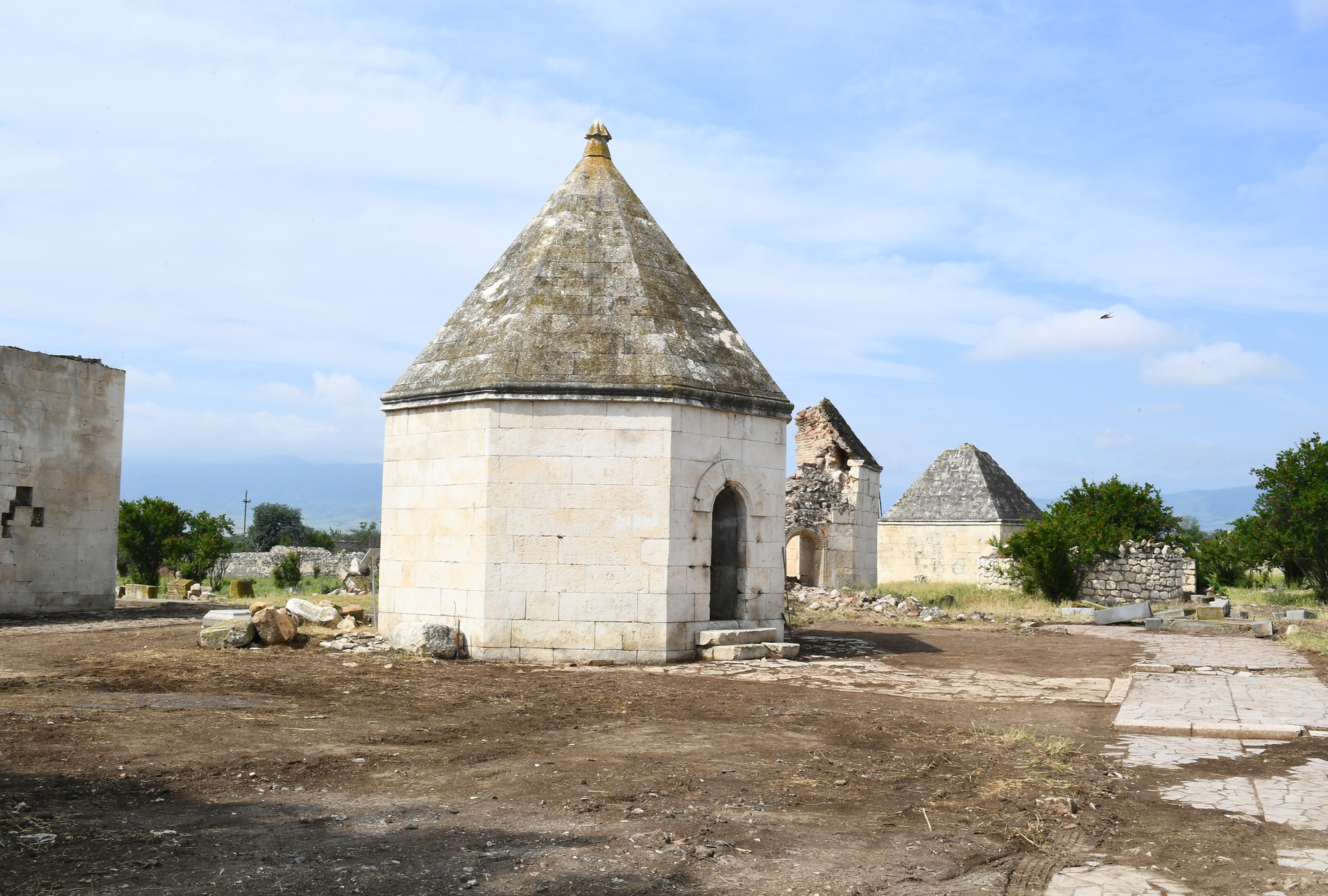
- View of the complex
- Interactive map of Imarat cemetery

Details
- Established: 18th century
- Location: Aghdam
- Country: Azerbaijan
- Coordinates: 39.9928399°N 46.9371745°E
- Type: cemetery
- Owned by: Aghdam City Executive Power

The Imarat Garvand cemetery (Azerbaijani: İmarət Qərvənd qəbristanlığı), or simply as the Imarat cemetery (Azerbaijani: İmarət qəbristanlığı) is a royal cemetery and a complex located in Aghdam, Azerbaijan. It contains the graves of some of the Azerbaijani and Turkic nobility of the Karabakh Khanate.

== History ==
The Mausoleum of Panah Ali Khan (r. 1748–1760), the founder of the Karabakh Khanate, and the first khan of Karabakh, dates back to the 18th-19th centuries and is located in the complex. It is adjacent to another tomb, that of Panah Ali's son, Ibrahim Khalil Khan (r. 1759–1806). Panah Ali Khan's tomb has an entrance gate. The entrance door has an arched structure. The tomb has a polygonal conical plan structure hosting inside the grave of the deceased. There is also a bust of Khurshidbanu Natavan in front of the tombs.

=== Modern period ===
The Armenian forces captured Aghdam in July 1993, during the First Nagorno-Karabakh War. The heavy fighting forced the entire population to flee eastwards, making Aghdam a ghost town. As part of an agreement that ended the Second Nagorno-Karabakh War, the town and its surrounding district were returned to Azerbaijani control on 20 November 2020.

According to the US Department of State the sacred and historic 18th-century tombs of Imarat Garvand Cemetery, the city's "Martyrs' Alley," were among the cemeteries throughout Aghdam that had been desecrated, looted, or destroyed. Western diplomats who visited Martyrs' Alley reported that there were holes where bodies had formerly been interred and that there was just one damaged tombstone left in the cemetery. However, a report by the Caucasus Heritage Watch of Cornell University states that the mausoleums of Ibrahim Khalil Khan and Mehdi Qoli Khan Javanshir in the cemetery had remained largely unchanged and well-preserved since the Soviet period. Furthermore, the mausoleum of Panah Ali Khan sustained major damage sometime before 2004 and the tomb of Khurshidbanu Natavan was destroyed and vandalized.

== Notable burials ==
- Panah Ali Khan, the founder and first ruler of the Karabakh Khanate.
- Ibrahim Khalil Khan, the third khan of Karabakh.
- Mehdi Qoli Khan Javanshir, the fourth and last khan of Karabakh.
- Jafargulu agha Javanshir, Azerbaijani poet and a major-general of the Imperial Russian Army.
- Govhar Agha, Azerbaijani poet and daughter of Ibrahim Khalil Khan.
- Khurshidbanu Natavan, Azerbaijani poet and daughter of Mehdigulu Khan.
- Khanbika Khanum, Azerbaijani poet and daughter of Khurshidbanu Natavan.
