= Aghdam =

Town in southwest Azerbaijan

Aghdam Ağdam
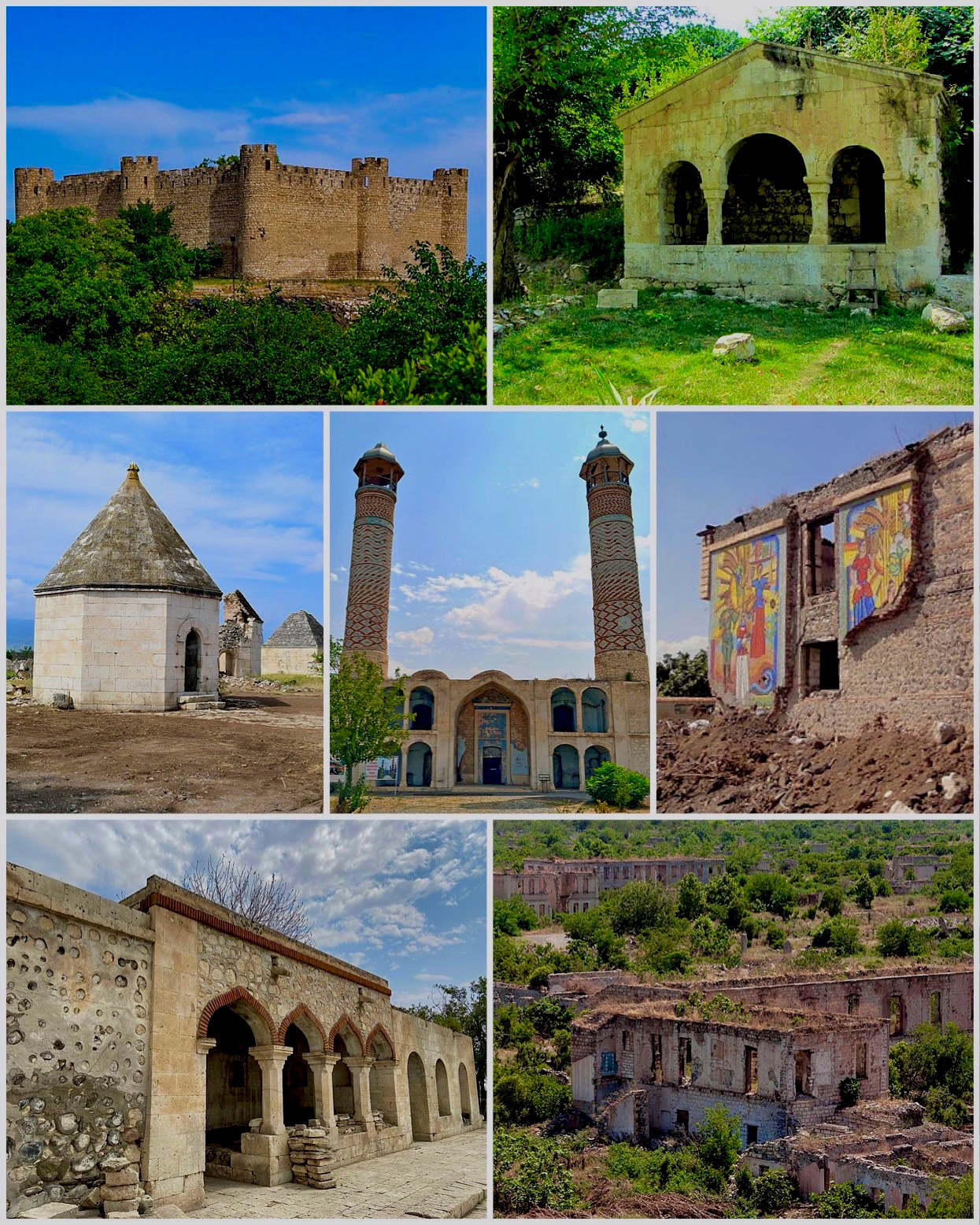
- From top left: Shahbulag Castle; Shahbulag Mosque; Imarat cemetery; Aghdam Mosque; Bread Museum; Panah Ali Khan's Palace; Ruins of Agdam

- Location within Azerbaijan Location within Karabakh Economic Region
- Coordinates: 39°59′35″N 46°55′50″E
- Country: Azerbaijan
- District: Aghdam
- Elevation: 369 m (1,211 ft)

Population
  - Total: approx. 1,958; Pre-war population was 28,031
- Time zone: UTC+4 (AZT)

Aghdam (Azerbaijani: Ağdam) is a town and the nominal capital of the Aghdam District of Azerbaijan. Founded in the 18th century, it was granted city status in 1828 and grew considerably during the Soviet period. Aghdam lies 26 km (16 miles) from Khankendi at the eastern foot of the Karabakh Range, on the outskirts of the Karabakh plain.

Before the First Nagorno-Karabakh War, butter, wine and brandy, machine, and silk factories, and an airport and two railway stations functioned there. By 1989, Aghdam had 28,031 inhabitants. As Azerbaijani forces withdrew from Karabakh following political turmoil in the country during the war, Armenian forces captured Aghdam in July 1993. The heavy fighting forced the city's population to flee eastwards. Upon the seizure, Armenian forces sacked the town. Until 2020, it was de facto a part of the breakaway Nagorno-Karabakh Republic, and was almost entirely ruined and uninhabited.

As part of the agreement that ended the 2020 Nagorno-Karabakh war, the town and its surrounding district came under Azerbaijani control on 20 November 2020.

The Azerbaijani government opened the town to Azerbaijani tourists in January 2022.

== Etymology ==
The city's name is of Azerbaijani origin, meaning "white house", where ağ means "white" and dam is "house" or "attic", thus referring to a "bright sun-lit, white house" which was given by Panah Ali Khan of the Karabakh Khanate in reference to the Imarat cemetery. Another possibility presented by Azerbaijani authors is that it was derived from ancient Turkic glossary meaning "small fortress".

In November 2010, it was renamed Akna (Armenian: Ակնա) by the Nagorno-Karabakh Republic authorities, who controlled the town until 2020.

== History ==
=== Early history ===
Aghdam lies in the vicinity of Tigranakert of Artsakh, an ancient Armenian city dating to the 2nd–1st centuries B.C.

The area where present-day Aghdam is located remained uninhabited till the establishment of the Karabakh Khanate. Aghdam was founded in the middle of the 18th century by Panah Ali Khan Javanshir after taking control of Shusha and ordering the construction of a hunting resort in the area. The first inhabitants of Aghdam were Azerbaijani Turks who came under the incentive of Panah Ali Khan; later various other Turkic tribes from Persia migrated and established a settlement here. In addition, it was the location of Panah Ali Khan’s summer palace and the Javanshir family cemetery. By 1805, Aghdam was already known as a large village. In 1828 following the Russian conquest of the Caucasus, it received the status of a city in the Shusha Uyezd of Elisabethpol Governorate. In 1868, when the city had 458 residents, a local Sunday fair was opened in Aghdam and the Aghdam Mosque was built. During the Soviet period, Aghdam became an administrative centre and was turned into a town-type settlement in 1930. Aghdam had multiple industries such as butter, wine, brandy, and silk factories, as well as hardware and tool factories. An airport and two railway stations functioned there. Aghdam had technical, agricultural, medical, and music schools.

=== First Nagorno-Karabakh War ===
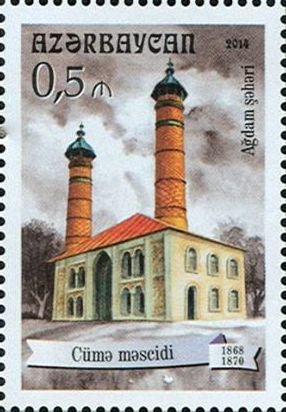
Aghdam Mosque on an Azerbaijani stamp, depicted as it looked before the Karabakh war

Aghdam was the scene of brutal fighting in the First Nagorno-Karabakh War. According to journalist Robert Parsons, Azerbaijani forces used Aghdam as a base for attacks on Karabakh, launching BM-21 Grad rockets and bombing raids from there against civilians, while Armenian forces indiscriminately shelled Aghdam.

According to Human Rights Watch, Armenian forces exploited the power vacuum in Azerbaijan at the time, and seized Aghdam in July 1993. As the city fell, its entire population fled eastward. HRW reported that "during their offensive against Aghdam, Karabakh Armenian forces committed hostage-taking, indiscriminate fire, and the forcible displacement of civilians" and that "after the city was seized, it was intentionally looted and burned under orders of Karabakh Armenian authorities". HRW considered these actions serious violations of the rules of war, but noted that given the tit-for-tat nature of the conflict, it considered the actions of Aghdam Armenian forces a revenge for the Azeri destruction of Mardakert, which, according to Thomas Goltz, who was in Mardakert in September 1992, became "a pile of rubble", noting "more intimate detritus of destroyed private lives: pots and pans, suitcases leaking sullied clothes, crushed baby strollers and even family portraits, still in shattered frames". The city has sometimes been referred as the Hiroshima of the Caucasus.

BBC journalist Roy Parsons reported that "every single Azeri house in the town was blown up to discourage return" as during the war, the Azeris used Aghdam as a base from which to shell Karabakh and Armenians could not trust them not to do it again.

The Armenians used the city as a buffer zone until November 2020; as a result, Aghdam was empty, decaying, and usually off-limits for sightseeing.

=== Armenian occupation ===
The ruined city once had a population of almost 30,000 people, but became an almost entirely uninhabited ghost town. An OSCE Fact-Finding Mission that visited the town in 2005 reported that the entire town of Aghdam was "in complete ruins with the exception of the mosque in the center". FFM observed activity of scavenging for building materials in the town. According to former U.S. Co-chair of the OSCE Minsk Group Carey Cavanaugh, the city was destroyed not in fighting, but by being dismantled "brick by brick". The Aghdam mosque, the only building left standing in Aghdam, has been vandalized with graffiti and used as a cowshed.

Aghdam's cemeteries, including the historic 18th-century tombs of Imarat Garvand were destroyed, desecrated and looted. Western diplomats reported unearthed graves and only just one damaged tombstone remaining in the Imarat Garvand cemetery.

In June 2010, Andrei Galafyev, a photographer who visited Aghdam in 2007, reported that "the floor in the mosque is entirely dirtied with manure of cattle, which wander on the ruins of Aghdam in the daytime." His photographs showed cattle within the Aghdam mosque. Its derelict condition, including a purportedly missing roof, drew criticism from Azerbaijani and Turkish communities, who wrote a letter in 2010 to Pope Benedict XVI asking him to "warn Armenians". In 2009, Shahverdyan then-head of Nagorno-Karabhakh's tourism department reported that the upper roof of the mosque had been restored in early 2009 and that their surroundings were cleaned from rubble and fenced in order to preserve Muslim cultural heritage in the area. In November 2010, the government of Artsakh announced that the mosque and its surroundings had been cleaned. They also announced that the mosque of Aghdam, as well as the mosques of Shusha, had been refurbished. However RFE/RL journalist, who visited Aghdam in 2011, posted photos of the mosque with no roof, and what he described as "the neglected and damaged interior of Aghdam's once-glorious mosque".

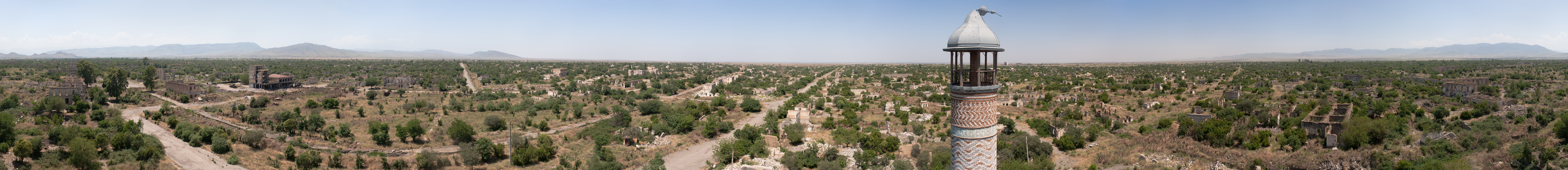
Panoramic view of ruins of Aghdam

=== Return to Azerbaijan ===
As part of the agreement that ended the 2020 Nagorno-Karabakh war, the town and its surrounding area were returned to Azerbaijani control on 20 November 2020. On 24 November 2020, president Aliyev and vice president Aliyeva visited the ruined city and made a speech. Shortly after the return to Azerbaijani control, clean-up of the city began. The government predicted that it would take 2–5 years for people to be able to live in the city again and that the last landmines would be removed in 15 years' time.

=== Reconstruction ===
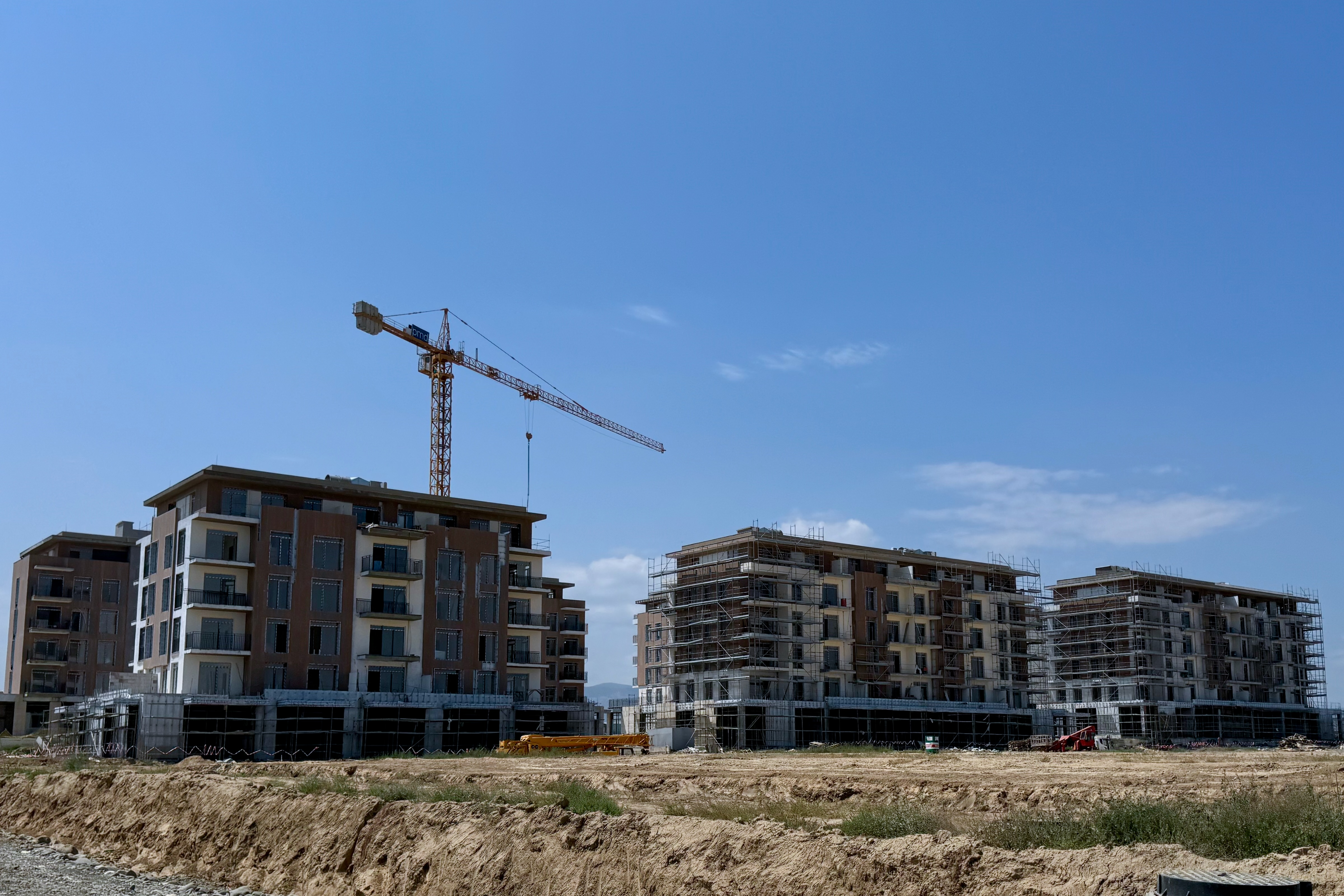
Residential buildings under construction in the city of Ağdam

On 22 May 2021, Azerbaijani news outlets announced government's plans of rebuilding Aghdam city center. In addition, construction of a road between Barda and Aghdam started. On 28 May president Aliyev visited the city and announced that its reconstruction had begun. He laid the foundation stones of the city's school No. 1, "Victory Museum" and "Open Air Occupation Museum", "the Industry Park", the first residential building and visited the Panah Ali Khan palace, the Imarat tombs and other reconstruction projects.

According to the announced plan of the city, eight nearby villages will be merged with Aghdam, with a projected population of around 100,000. The residential areas will consist of multi-storey buildings and private houses. The city will be surrounded by gardens and be rebuilt as "smart city", to become a green energy zone. Inside the city, a large green belt covering an area of 125 hectares, an artificial lake, canals and bridges, motorways, pedestrian and bike paths, and electricity powered public transportation are also planned.

Reconstruction efforts speed up in 2025 with the inauguration of multiple facilities. New infrastructure such as a secondary school, a kindergarten, a digital energy management center, and a second residential housing complex with 1,268 apartments.

== Geography ==
=== Climate ===
Aghdam has a temperate climate (Cfa) according to the Köppen climate classification.

Climate data for Agdam (1971-1990)
Month	Jan	Feb	Mar	Apr	May	Jun	Jul	Aug	Sep	Oct	Nov	Dec	Year
Mean daily maximum °C (°F)	6.2 (43.2)	7.0 (44.6)	11.2 (52.2)	18.6 (65.5)	23.1 (73.6)	27.8 (82.0)	31.3 (88.3)	30.1 (86.2)	25.9 (78.6)	19.1 (66.4)	13.0 (55.4)	8.6 (47.5)	18.5 (65.3)
Daily mean °C (°F)	2.3 (36.1)	2.8 (37.0)	6.1 (43.0)	12.3 (54.1)	16.1 (61.0)	20.4 (68.7)	24.6 (76.3)	23.3 (73.9)	18.6 (65.5)	13.5 (56.3)	8.2 (46.8)	4.1 (39.4)	12.7 (54.9)
Mean daily minimum °C (°F)	−0.9 (30.4)	0.0 (32.0)	3.2 (37.8)	8.9 (48.0)	13.5 (56.3)	17.8 (64.0)	21.2 (70.2)	20.0 (68.0)	16.4 (61.5)	10.6 (51.1)	5.8 (42.4)	1.5 (34.7)	9.8 (49.6)
Average precipitation mm (inches)	15 (0.6)	24 (0.9)	32 (1.3)	48 (1.9)	73 (2.9)	64 (2.5)	33 (1.3)	27 (1.1)	30 (1.2)	50 (2.0)	32 (1.3)	19 (0.7)	447 (17.6)
Average rainy days	4	6	7	7	10	7	3	3	4	6	5	4	66
Source: NOAA

== Demographics ==
Year	Population	Ethnic groups	Source
1908	931	Mostly Tatars (later known as Azerbaijanis)	Caucasian Calendar
1923	1,660		
1926	7,910	93.6% Turks (i.e. Azerbaijani)	Soviet census
1939	10,746	83.3% Azerbaijani, 8.7% Russian, 5.3% Armenian	Soviet census
1959	16,061	92% Azerbaijani, 3.6% Russian, 3.4% Armenian	Soviet census
1970	21,277	94.9% Azerbaijani, 2% Russian & Ukrainian, 2% Armenian	Soviet census
1979	23,483	97% Azerbaijani, 1.3% Russian & Ukrainian, 1.2% Armenian	Soviet census
1989	28,031		Soviet census
1993	Capture by Armenian forces. Expulsion of the Azerbaijani population		
2005	0		

== Economy ==
Before the First Nagorno-Karabakh War, butter, wine and brandy, machine factories and a railway station functioned in the city. On 28 May 2021, the Aghdam Industrial Park was announced, with construction ongoing.

By 2025, the Aghdam Industrial Park had directed more than 65% of its territory to residents. The park has 29 resident business entities with a combined investment portfolio of $160 million which creates 380 permanent jobs.

== Culture ==
=== Music and media ===
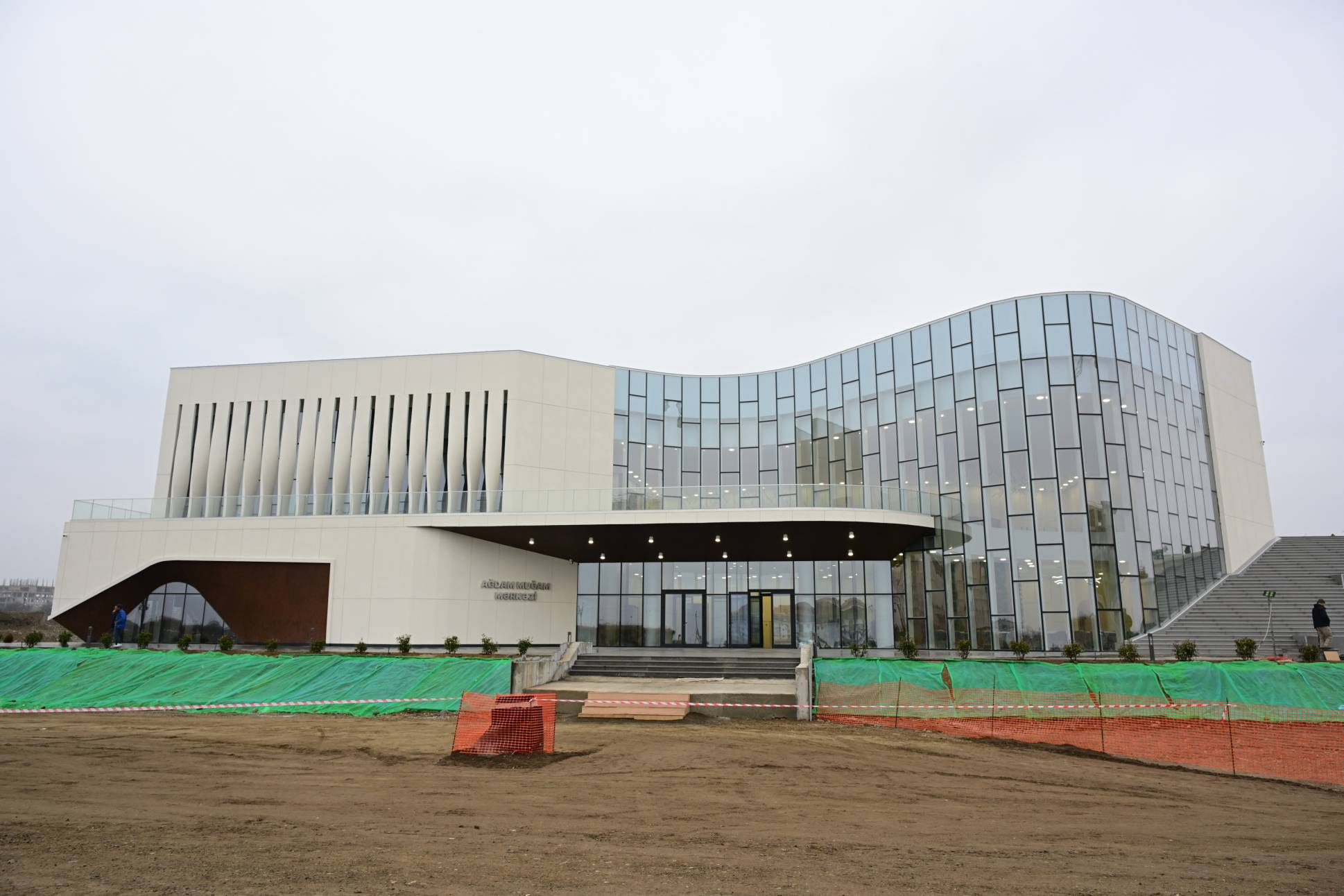
Agdam Mugham Center

Mugham music, a musical tradition from the Karabakh region, is an important part of Aghdam's musical heritage; the city was home to Aghdam Mugham School and its "Karabakh nightingales" ensemble.

=== Sport ===
An association football team used to be based in the town. That team is now based in Baku. It competes in the Azerbaijan Premier League under the name Qarabağ FK. The Imarat Stadium was destroyed from bombardments by Armenian military forces in the First Nagorno-Karabakh War.

== Transport ==
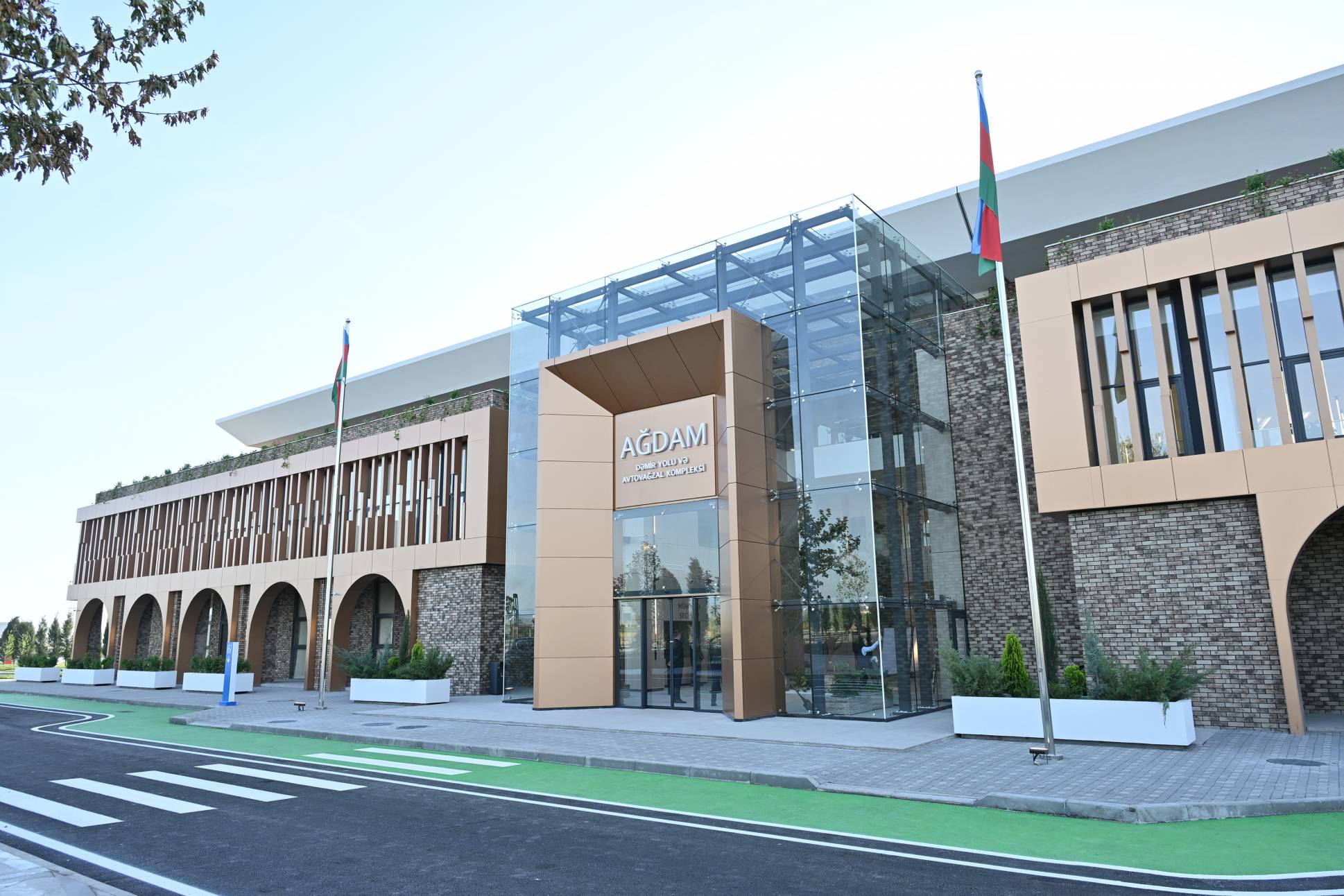
Aghdam Railway and Bus Station Complex in May 2025

Prior to the war, the city had bus and tram lines and an airport which no longer function. In November 2020, Azerbaijan Railways announced that it was discussing plans to build a 104 km railway line from Yevlakh to Stepanakert via Aghdam. On May 10th, 2025, president of the Republic of Azerbaijan Ilham Aliyev visited the newly built Aghdam Railway and Bus Station Complex for its inauguration. The railway station is expected to see between 800 and 1,000 passengers a day, while the Bus Terminal will serve 1,300 to 1,500 passengers a day. After the inauguration, the first train departed the station on the Barda-Aghdam Railway line.

== Education ==
Prior to the city's destruction and subsequent abandonment, it contained 74 schools, none of which are functioning now.

== Notable residents ==
Some of the city's notable former residents include military commanders Allahverdi Baghirov and Asif Maharammov, footballers Ramiz Mammadov, Mushfig Huseynov and Vüqar Nadirov, mugham singers Gadir Rustamov, Mansum Ibrahimov, Arif Babayev and Sakhavat Mammadov, actor Jeyhun Mirzayev, scientist Zakir Mammadov, writer Nushaba Mammadli, publicist and singer Roya and Günel Zeynalova, guitarist Ramish.

== See also ==
- Agdam Tea House
- Aghdam Bread Museum
- Panah Ali Khan's Palace
- Otuzikilar district
