= Safi bey's House =

Safi bey’s House
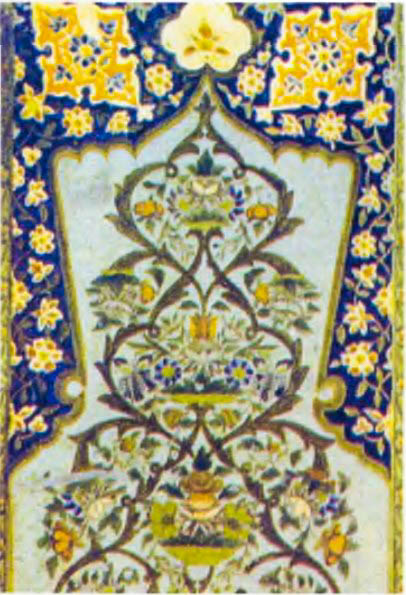
- Wall decoration of Safi bey’s house

General information
- Type: house
- Location: Shusha
- Completed: 19th century
- Owner: Safi bey

Safi bey’s house is a historical and architectural monument of the 18th century being located in Shusha.

== Architectural features ==
Although Safi bey’s two-storey house with a basement is a reminiscent of the Shusha houses built in the 18th and 19th centuries, it differs from them in size. In the centre of the house, which has an elongated rectangular shape, there is a two-story loggia, surrounded by risalits on the sides.

In addition to the office space on the ground floor, there are two living rooms in the risalits. In the centre of the second floor, there is a large living room connected to the first floor by a stone staircase built into the facade, and two rooms in the adjoining risalits. The both rooms have a direct access to the central hall. The ceiling of the hall and loggia, as well as the surface around the doors, are decorated with tastefully painted frescoes.

The accuracy of the planning solution is also reflected in the design of the facades which, fully reflecting the location of the premises in the plan, are divided into three parts. A simple decorative element of the facades successfully complements the laconic volume-spatial solution of the building. These paintings were made by the master of decorative painting and ornament Ganbar Garabaghi.

== See also ==
- Zohrabbayovs' house
- House of Mehmandarovs
- House of Khurshidbanu Natavan

== Literature ==
- Elturan Avalov (1977). Архитектура города Шуши и проблемы сохранения его исторического облика. Baku: Elm.
- Abdulvahab Salamzadeh (1964). Архитектура Азербайджана XVI-XIX вв. Baku: Академия наук Азербайджанской ССР.
- Sarkisov, A.V.; Alizade, A.M. (1950). О некоторых архитектурных памятниках Шуши (Памятники архитектуры Азербайджана) [About some architectural monuments of Shushi (Architectural monuments of Azerbaijan)] (in Russian). Vol. II. Moscow-Baku.
