= Haji Gulular Palace =

Azerbaijani architectural monument

Coordinates: 39°45′43.9″N 46°45′31.6″E

- Azerbaijani: Hacı Quluların mülkü
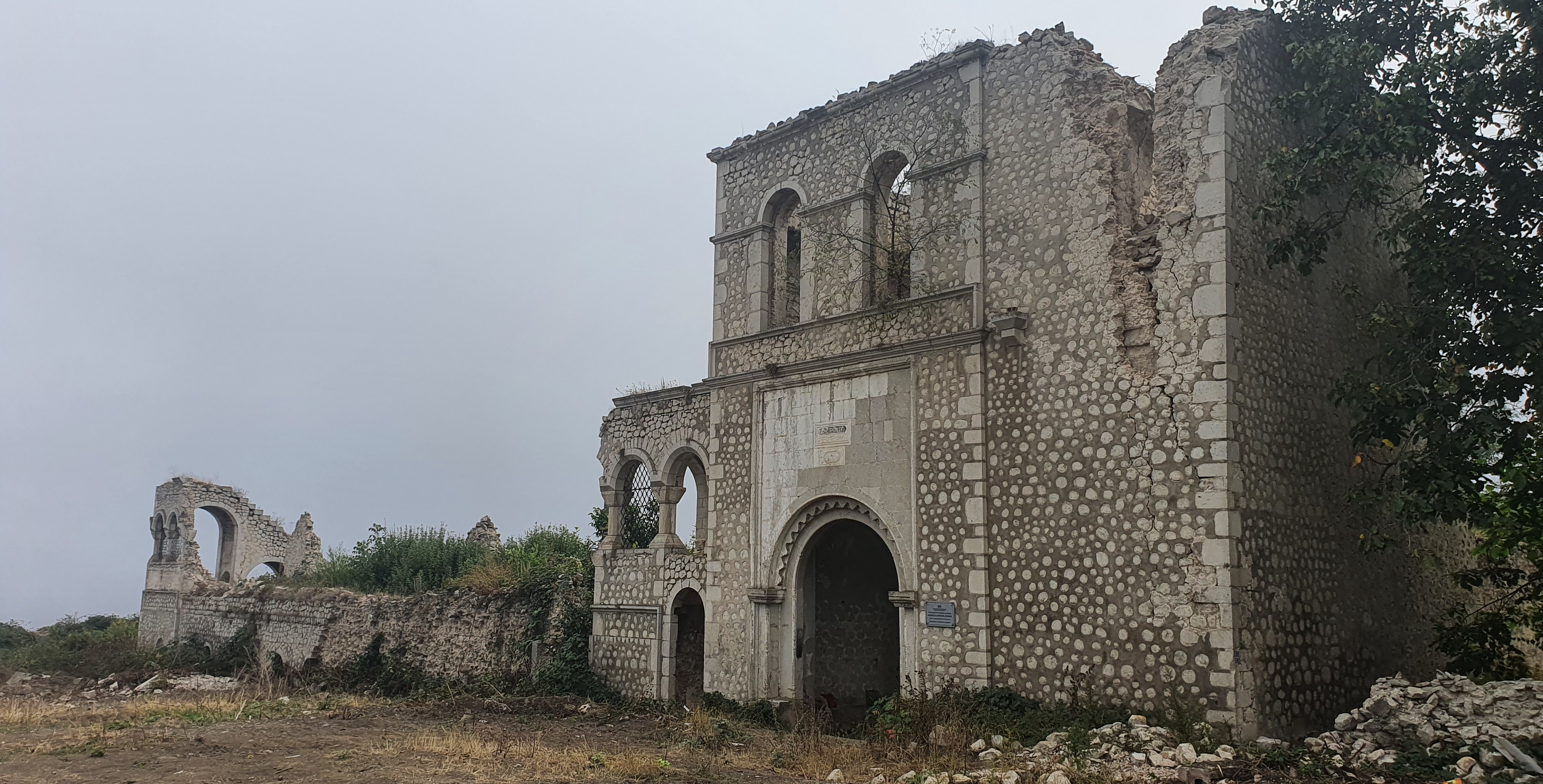
- Interactive map of the Haji Gulular Palace area

General information
- Location: Shusha, Azerbaijan
- Completed: 1849
- Owner: Gulu Mahammadali oghlu

Haji Gulular Palace is a historical and architectural monument located in the city of Shusha. The palace was built in 1849 in the Chukhur mehelle by the order of the merchant of the second guild Gulu Mahammadali oghlu.

Nowadays, some parts of the walls have survived.

== History ==
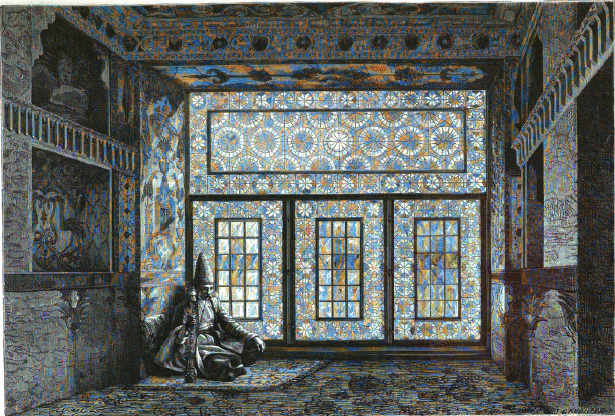
The interior of one of the palace's living rooms with a shebeke window on the drawing of Vasilyi Vereshchagin in 1865

The edifice was built in the Chukhur mehelle by the order of the merchant of the second guild Gulu Mahammadali oghlu. The construction began in 1849. Haji Gulu, who once served to Jafargul khan Muhammadgasan oghlu Saryjaly-Javanshir, engaged in trade. Consequently, over time, he became one of the wealthiest merchants of Shusha.

The estate, known as the Haji Gulu Palace, was distinguished by its architectural style and national flavor. The palace had 46 rooms and two large guest rooms. The drawing of the Russian artist V. V. Vereshchagin, who visited Shusha in 1865, depicts one of these halls.

During the battles for the city in 1992, the Haji Gulu building was subjected to the artillery fire, as a result its walls were destroyed. Currently, some parts of the walls are preserved.

== Architectural features ==
The three-storey house on the plan has the shape of an elongated rectangle. A staircase connects the service areas of the first floor with the dining room and the living areas of the second floor. The third floor of the building consists of a large hall and the guest rooms located next to it. On the facade overlooking the courtyard, there is an open three-storey veranda. A staircase leads to veranda, built on the back of the house.

The rooms are built in accordance with their official purpose. Along with a large living room in the form of a hall, which is typical for the wealthy Shusha houses, the dining room and the bedroom also have architectural forms that correspond to the profile of their use. The communication with the first floor is assured through the main staircase and another for the servants.

Unlike most of the Shusha houses and palaces, a considerable number of large windows were installed in the Haji Gulu edifice, located on all facades of the building. All windows are in the shebeke style.

== Gallery ==
Palace in 2021

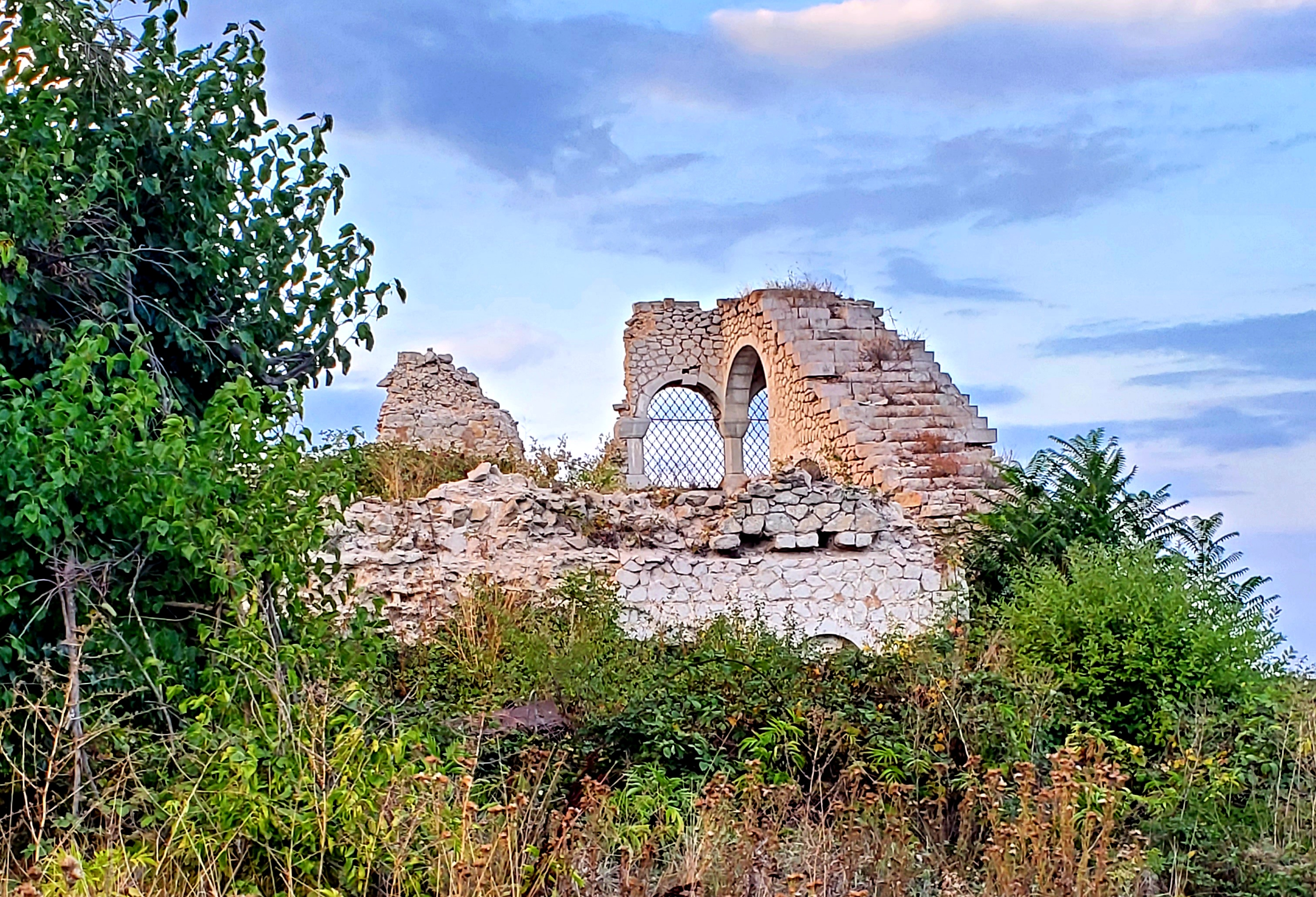

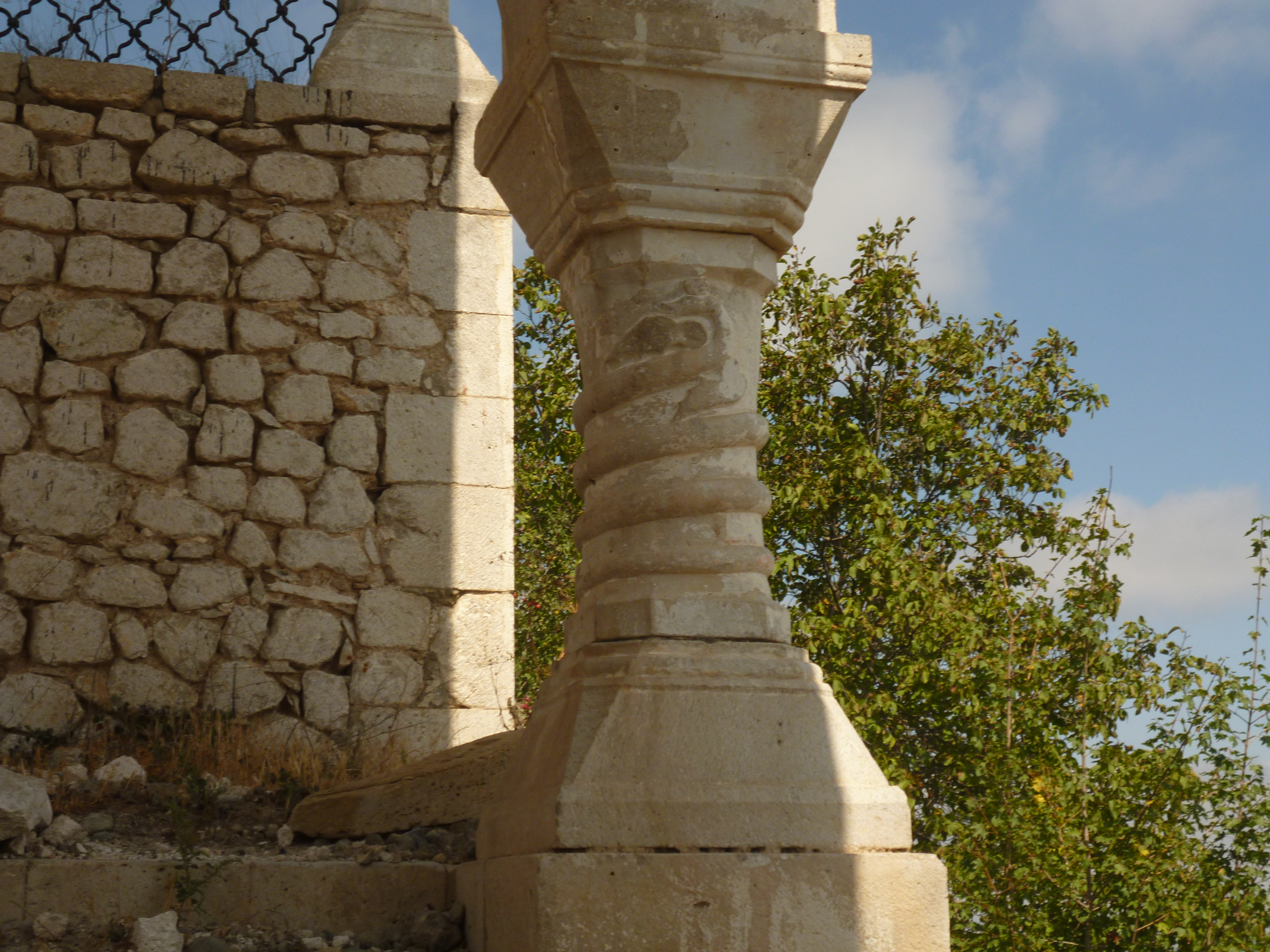

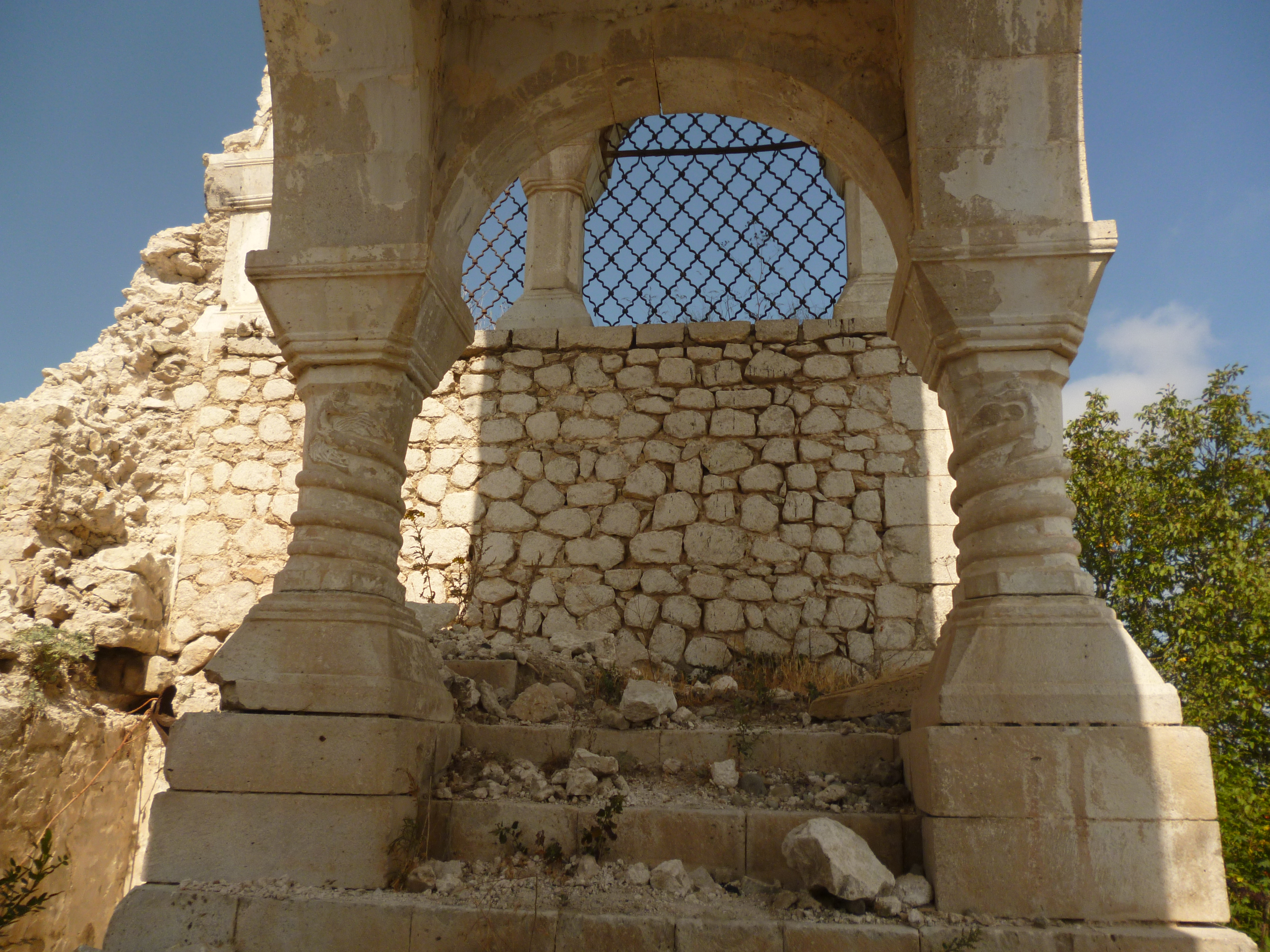

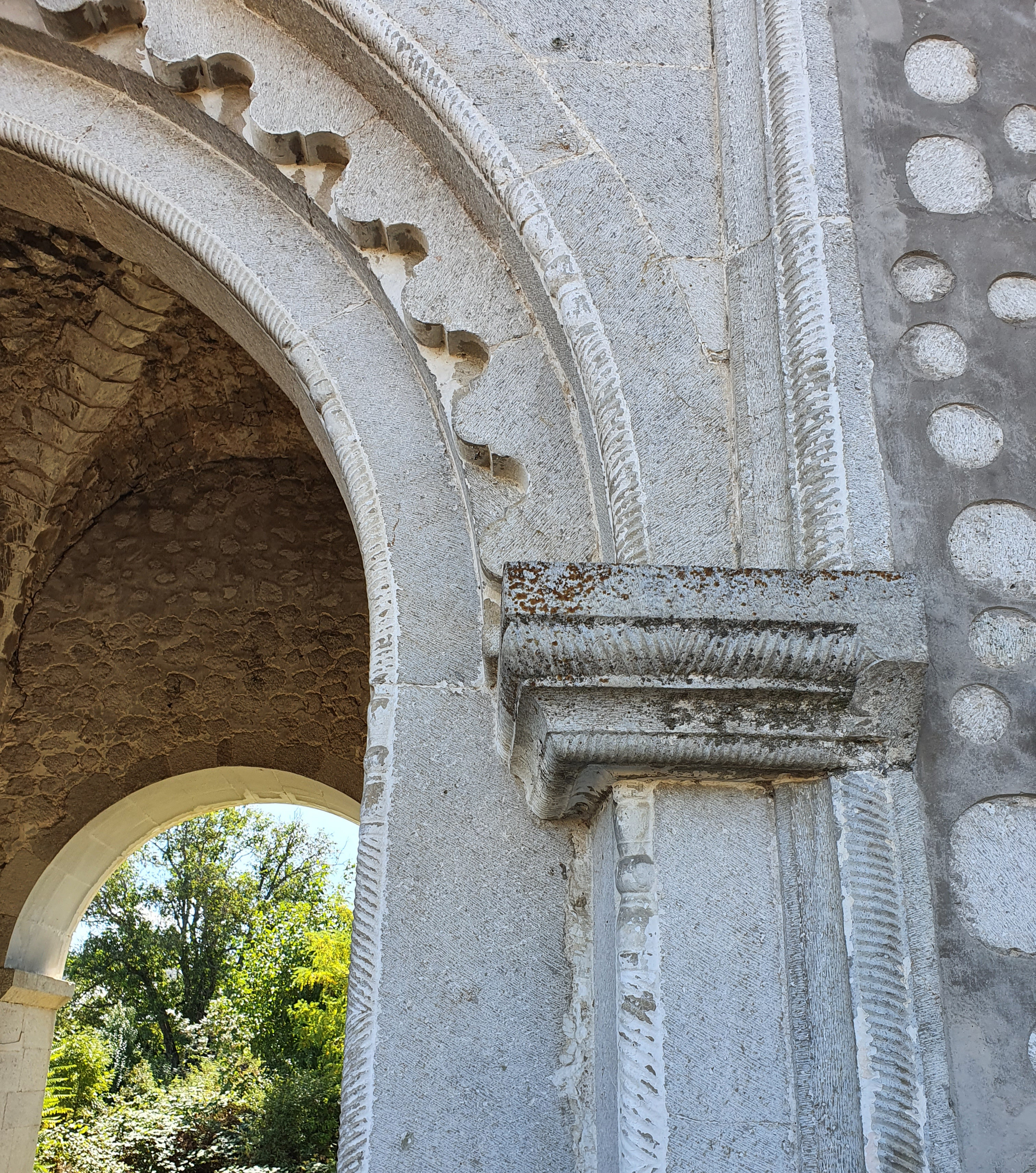

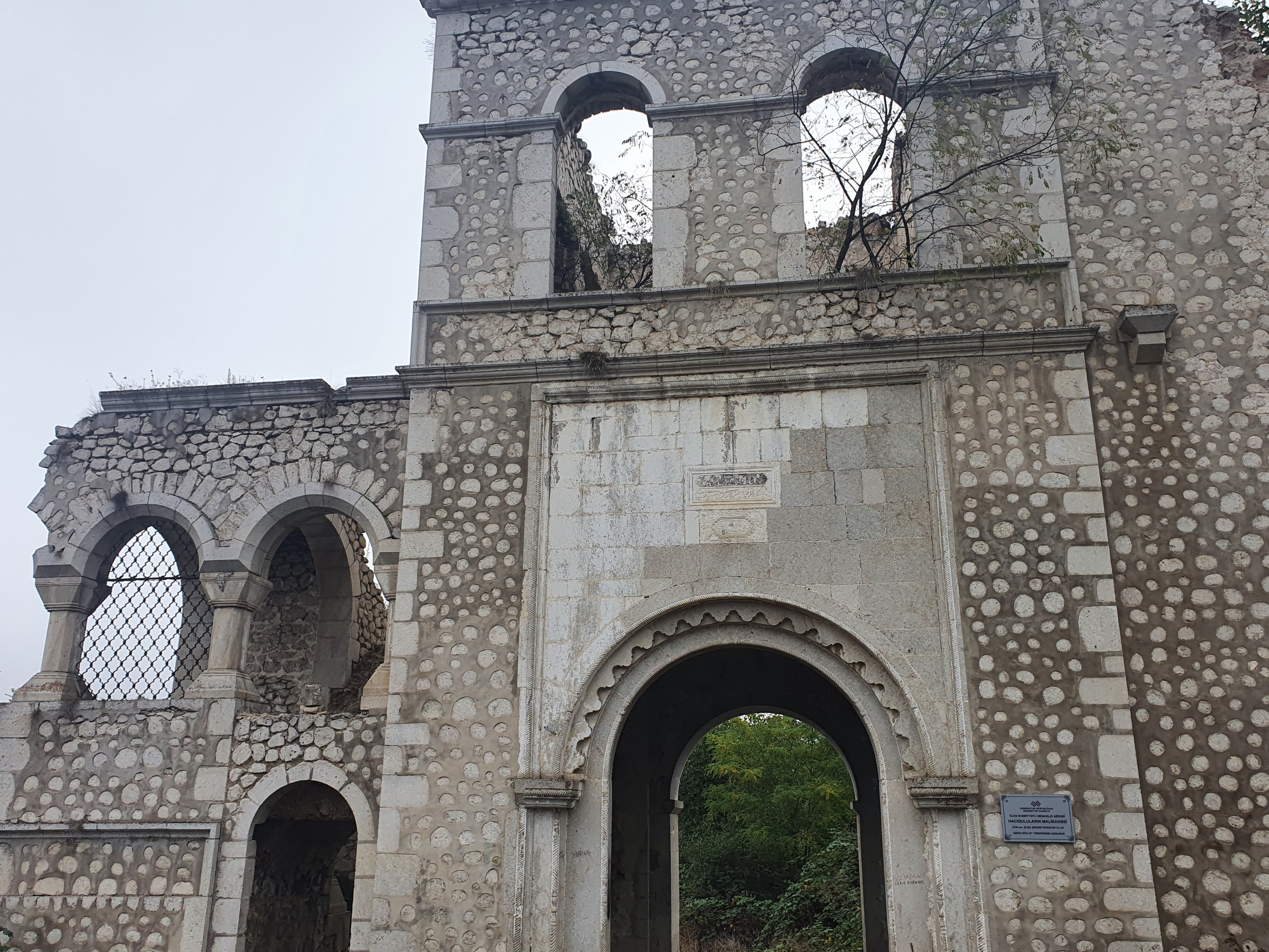

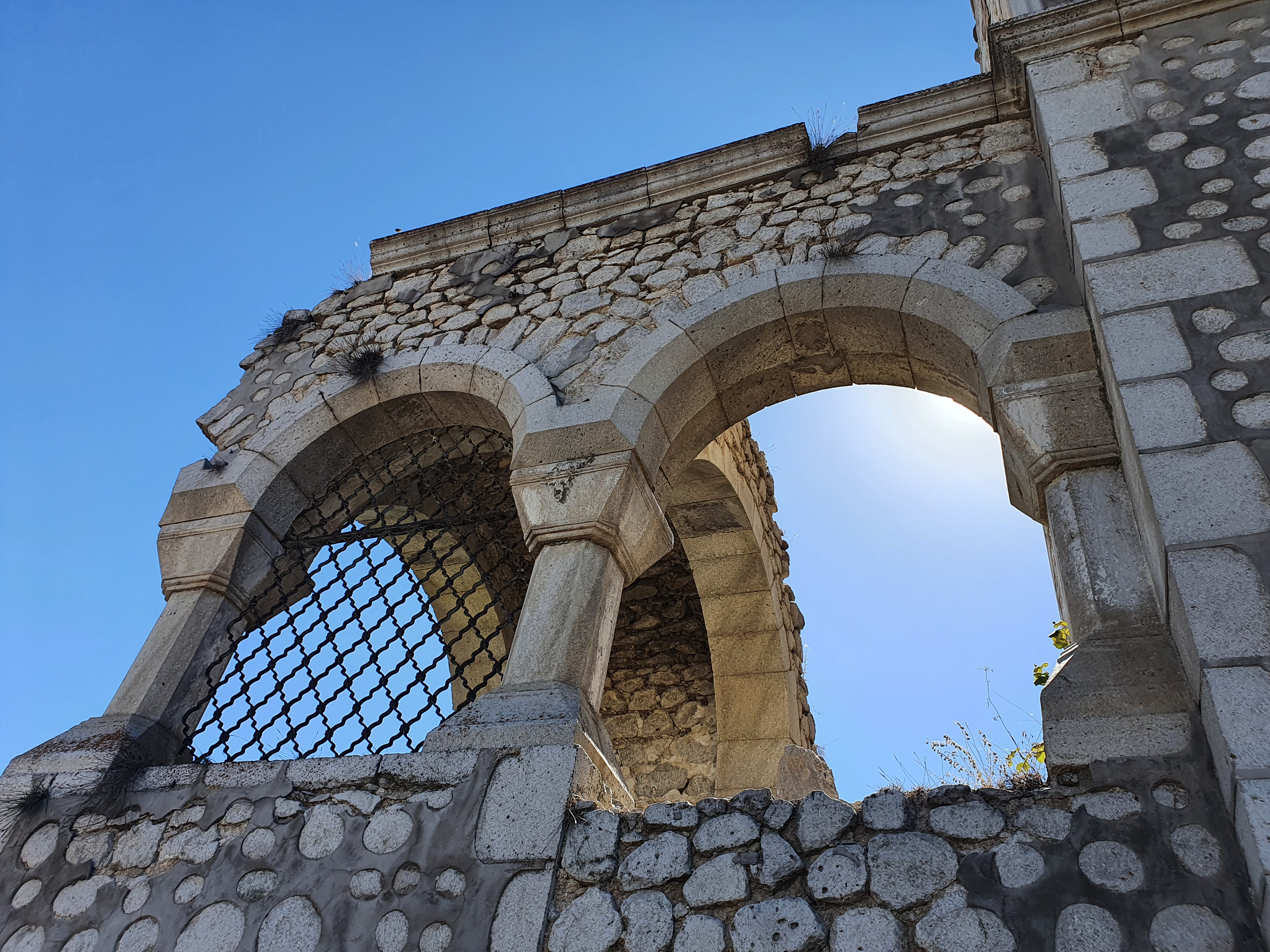

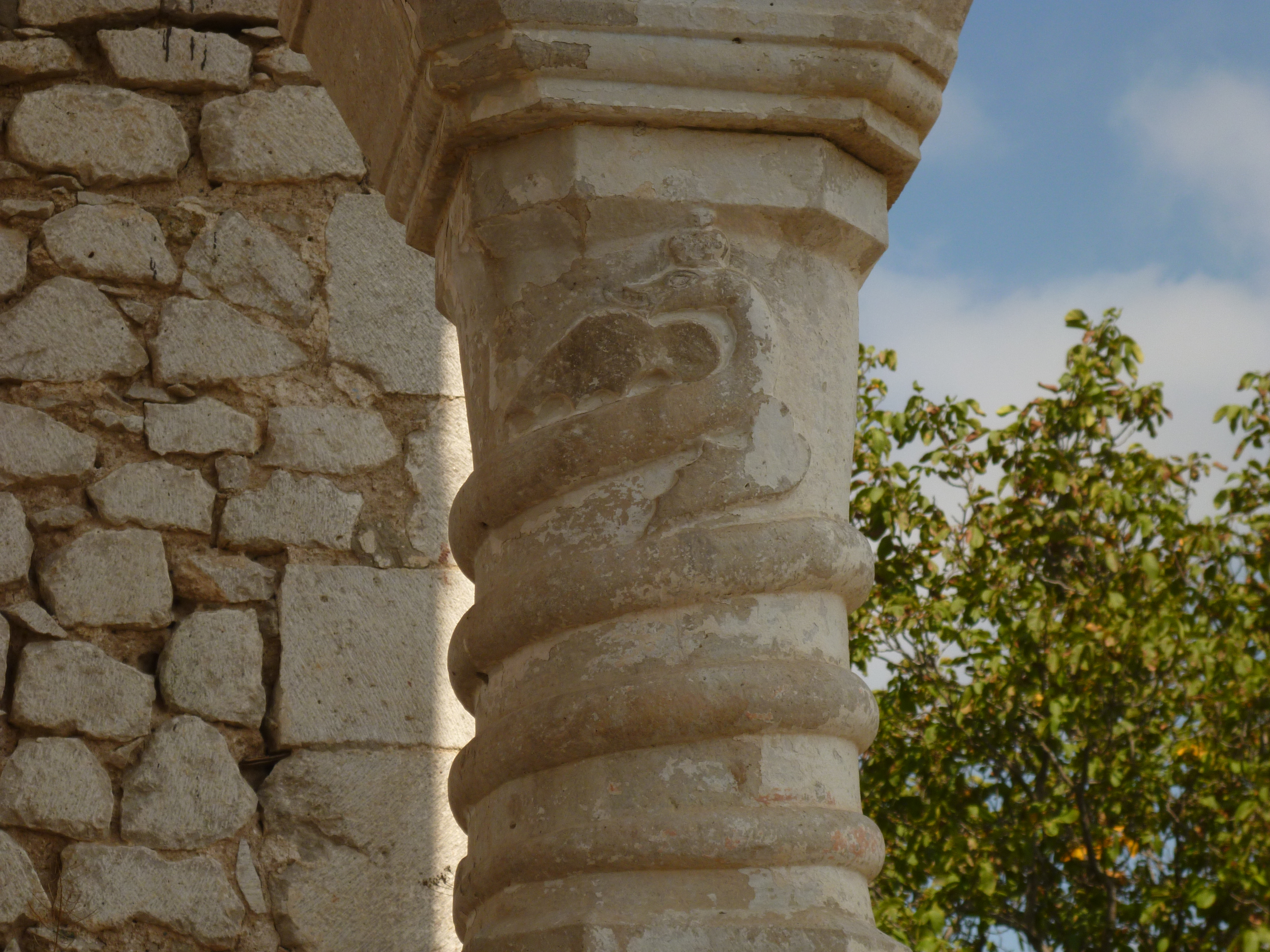

== See also ==
- Asad bey’s House
- Zohrabbayovs' house
- House of Khurshidbanu Natavan

== Literature ==
- Salamzadeh, Abdulvahab (1964). Архитектура Азербайджана XVI-XIX вв [Architecture of Azerbaijan XVI-XIX centuries]. Baku: Академия наук Азербайджанской ССР.
