= Asad-bey's House =

Historical monument in Shusha, Azerbaijan

- Azerbaijani: Əsəd bəyin evi
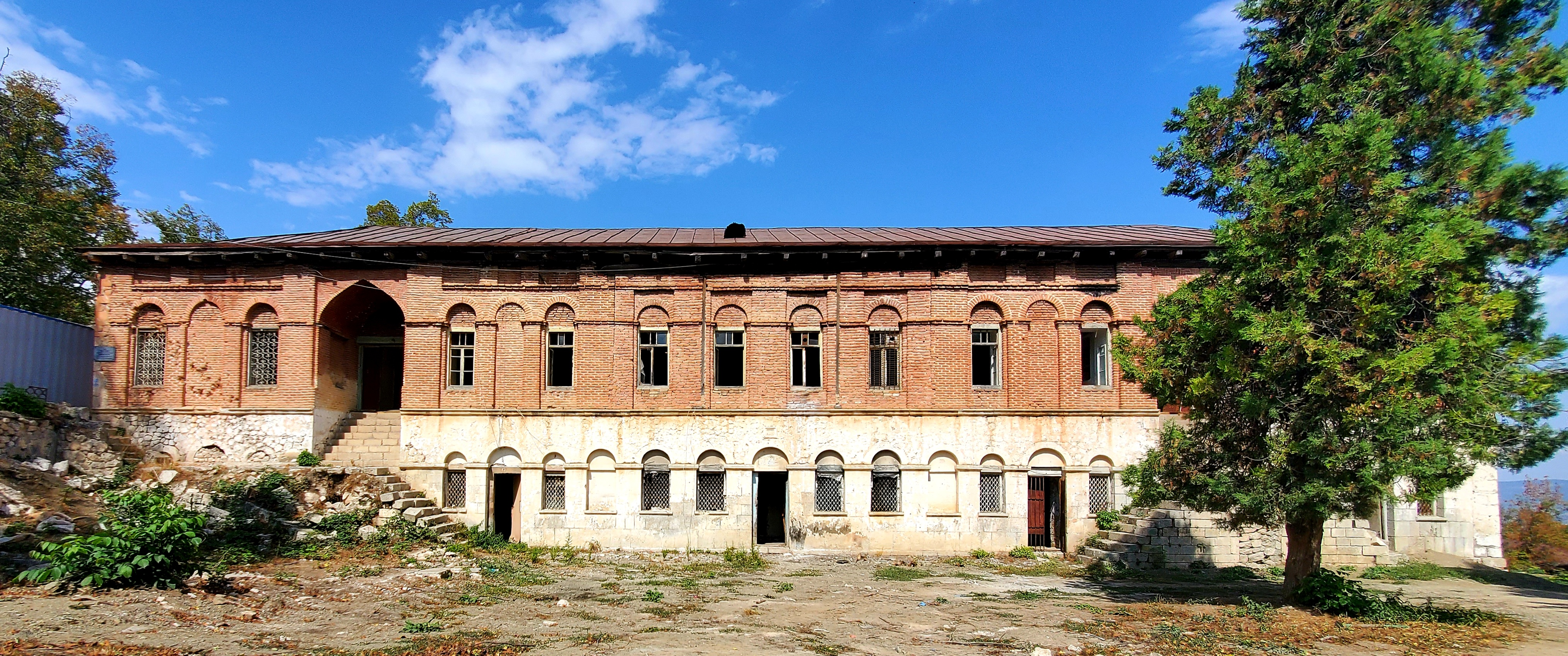

General information
- Location: Shusha, Azerbaijan
- Completed: 18th century
- Owner: Asad-bey

Asad-bey's House (Azerbaijani: Əsəd bəyin evi) is a historical and architectural monument of the early 18th century being located in Shusha. The house belonged to one of the famous representatives of the noble family of Shusha - to Asad-bey.

== Architectural features ==
The House of Asad-bey, situated not far from the Natavan Palace, has many similarities in terms of architecture and planning with the Shekikhanovs’ house in Sheki. As in the Shekikhanovs’ house, a large T-shaped hall is located in the center of the composition of Asad-bey's house. The rest of the rooms are grouped around it.

The main difference between the house of Asad-bey and other houses of the nobility having a similar plan is the large number of rooms. The rooms on the first floor of the house, which has the shape of an elongated rectangle, are divided into three groups: a large hall in the center and small rooms around it, and on the sides, there are two more groups of rooms, each of which consists of two rooms.

There is no internal communication between the floors. The second floor can be accessed by the stone stairs built in the both corners of the house's facade. They lead to two lobbies on the second floor. From these lobbies, through small corridors, it can be entered a large living room, in which a large shebeke window is installed along the entire length of the facade. Doors open from the lobbies and corridors to the rooms around the hall. On the second floor, in the western part of the building, there is a second, smaller hall and 10 more rooms.

The local white rocky stones were used in the construction of the first floor, and the boiled red bricks on the second floor. The composition of the facade is built on the basis of three huge shebeke windows and two deep niches located next to them slightly passing to the first floor.

== Gallery ==
House in 2021

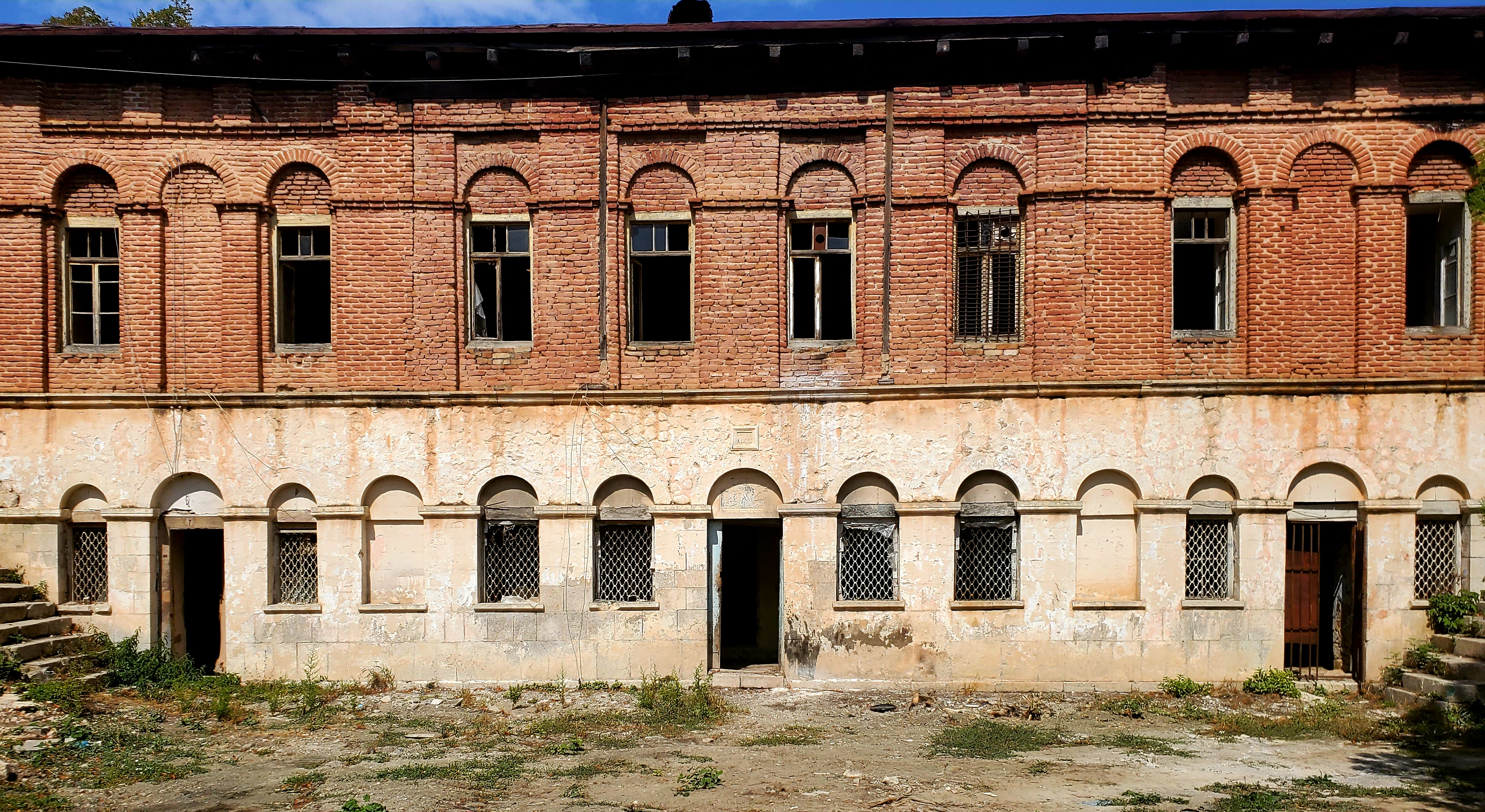

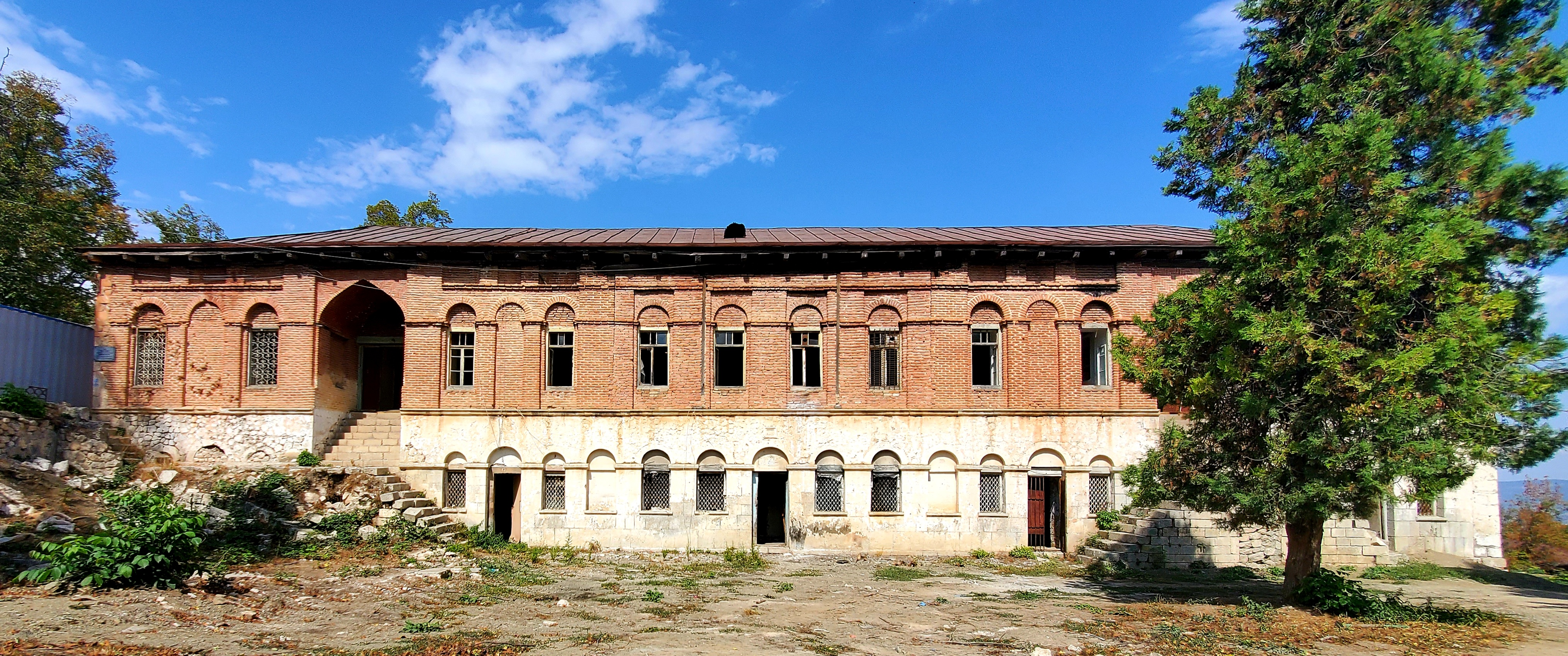

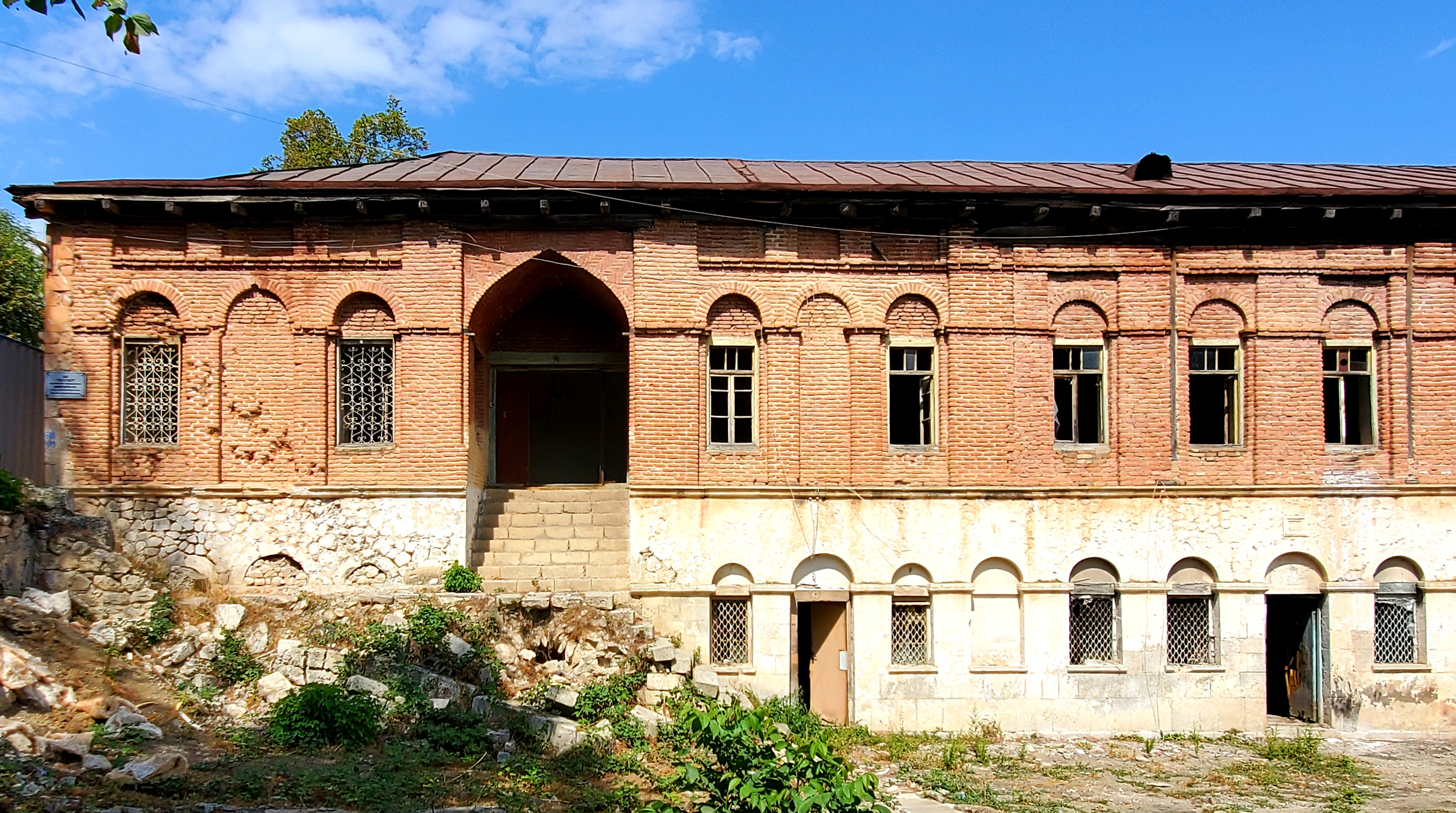

== See also ==
- Haji Gulular Palace
- Zohrabbayovs' house
- House of Khurshidbanu Natavan
