= House of Mehmandarovs =

House in Shusha, Azerbaijan

- Azerbaijani: Mehmandarovların evi Armenian: Եսայի Ղարամյանցի տուն
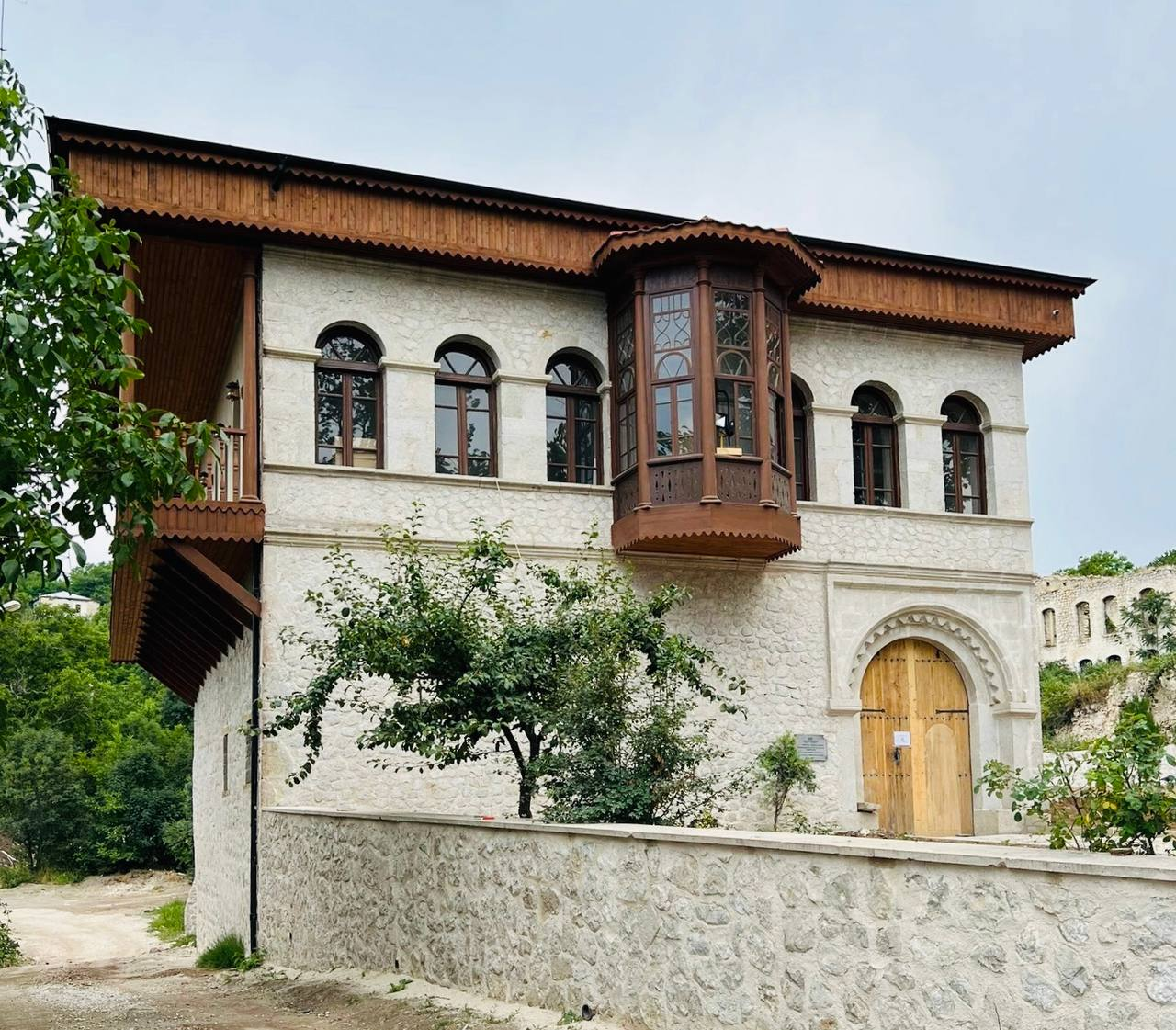
- Mehmandarov's small house after restoration
- Interactive map of the House of Mehmandarovs area

General information
- Location: Shusha, Azerbaijan
- Coordinates: 39.756519°N 46.753514°E
- Completed: 18th century
- Owner: Yesai Gharamyants Karim bey Mehmandarov

Design and construction
- Architect: Karbalayi Safikhan Karabakhi

The Mehmandarovs' House or Yesai Gharamyants House is a historic palace-type residential complex located in Shusha. It is one of the most interesting examples of the 18th century's civil architecture of Karabakh. The residential complex, which originally belonged to the Armenian Lieutenant Yesai Gharamyants during the 19th century, came into the possession of the Mehmandarov family in 1918. It includes the Large Residential Building, the Small Residential Building and the Family Mosque. The complex is fenced with stone walls. It was previously the site of the Shusha Museum of History.

== History ==
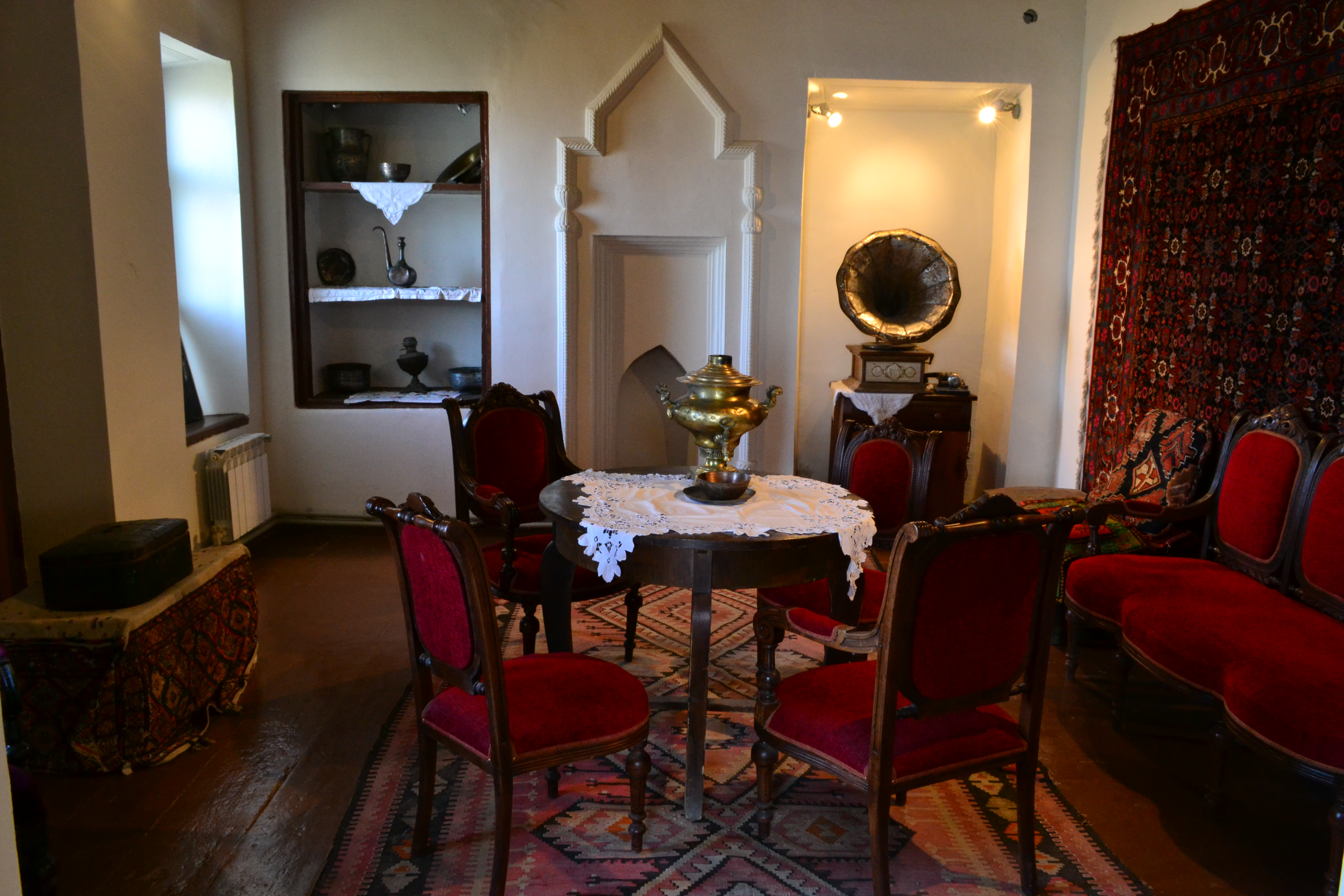
Interior of the house and museum prior to 2020

The complex was built by Karbalayi Safikhan Karabakhi and during the early 19th century served as the private residence of Armenian Lieutenant Yesai Gharamyants (Gramov). In 1918, the complex came into the possession of the Mehmandarov family. During the Soviet period, from 1921 to around 1971 or 1972, the Shusha city maternity hospital was located in the Large Residential Building, while the Museum of Shusha History and oriental carpets was located in the Small Residential Building from 1973 to 1992. The mosque on the territory of the complex also served as the neighbourhood's mosque. In May of 1992, under Armenian control, the building was used as a museum of history and geology until 2014 when it officially became the "Shushi City History Museum." After the establishment of the control over the city by the Azerbaijani armed forces in 2020, the complex is undergoing repair and restoration work.

== Architectural features ==
The house has a square shape. Three rooms, out of four on the second floor, open onto the veranda at the house's rear of the, and a large bay window, which serves as a guest hall, overlooks the main facade.

Such a solution of the facade, despite the lack of symmetry, creates the impression of harmony and balance in the architectural parts of the house. The staircase and the wooden veranda on the rear façade of the house add to its overall appearance. A special place in the house's architecture is occupied by a well-lit thanks to its wide windows and richly decorated guest room.

== Wall murals ==
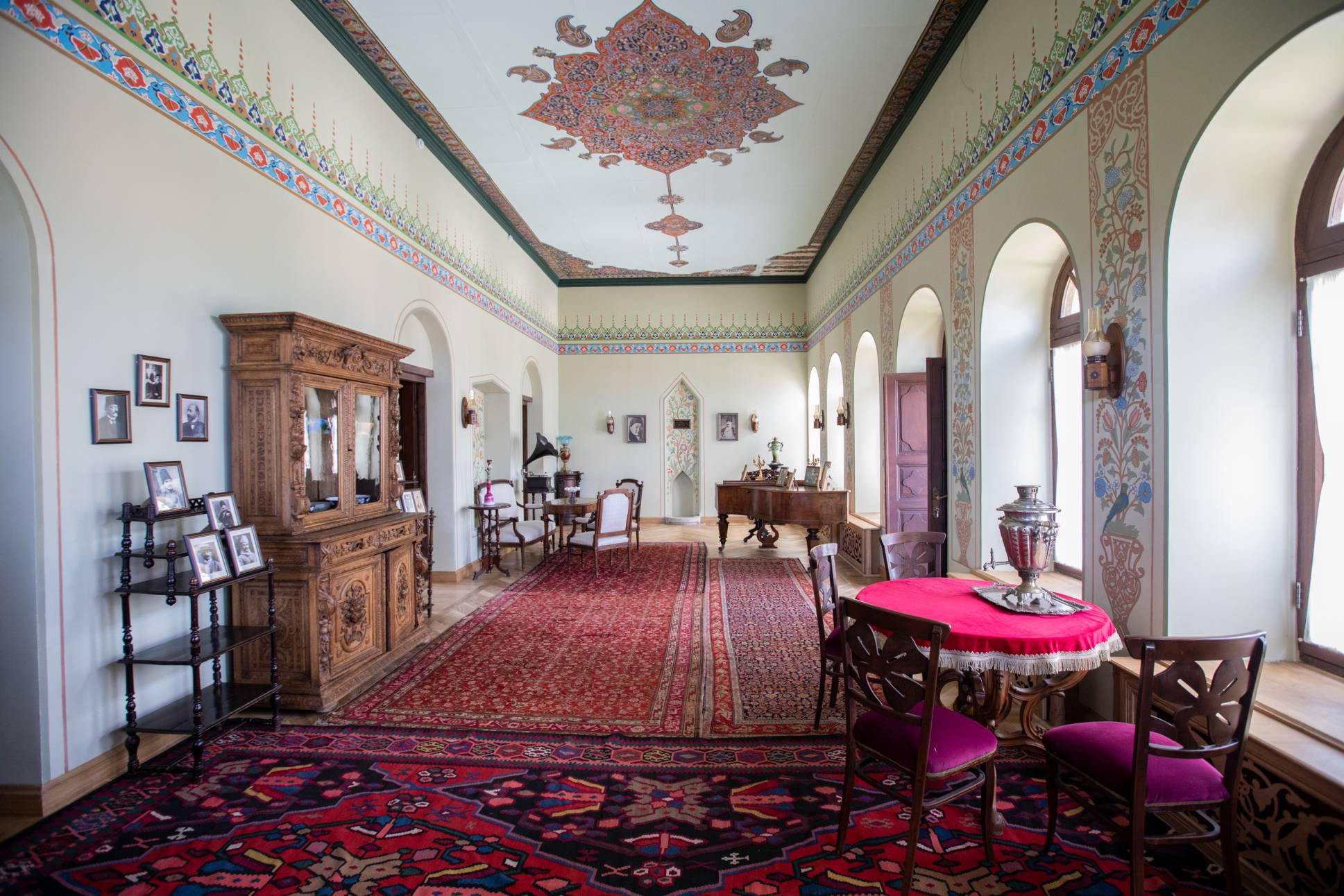
The interior of one of the halls of the house after restoration works

The interiors of the Big Residential Building and the Family Mosque were decorated with murals by Ust Gambar Karabagi, reminding the ones in the palace of Sheki khans. During the Soviet time, the Museum of Shusha's History was located in the Small Residential Building.

While painting the panels of the Small Room in the Mehmandarovs' house, Usta Gambar used a motif peculiar only to him and nowhere else repeated. In such an image, with a dominant repeating pattern, there is no traditional pillar division of panels into sectors. This rich composition depicts various birds sitting on the branches of plants. It resembles the murals on the second floor of the Sheki Khans' palace. The images in this panel, created using open tones, were placed on the bottom of the wall, so they are poorly preserved (compared to other murals in the room).

The art critic N. Miklashevskaya, who studied the wall paintings of the house, claims that "although the frieze images that both in the Palace of the Sheki Khans and in the Mehmandarov's house were created under the direction of Ust Gambar, the images of the Mehmandarov's house turned out better. They harmonized more with the general images of the room." She also believes that the painting of the panel in Mehmandarov's house, in terms of the thoroughness of execution and subtlety of colours, is higher than the similar paintings in the hall of the first floor of the Sheki palace. Both in the Small Room and in the Hall, there are lancet-shaped fireplaces characteristic to Shusha, covered with flat pictorial ornaments.

The main silver branches of the frieze of the Sheki Khans' palace are surrounded by realistically depicted flowers; a large amount of silver was used here, with the colours being lighter while the patterns in there are presented in darker colours. The patterns on the frieze are also repeated on the tympanum panels.

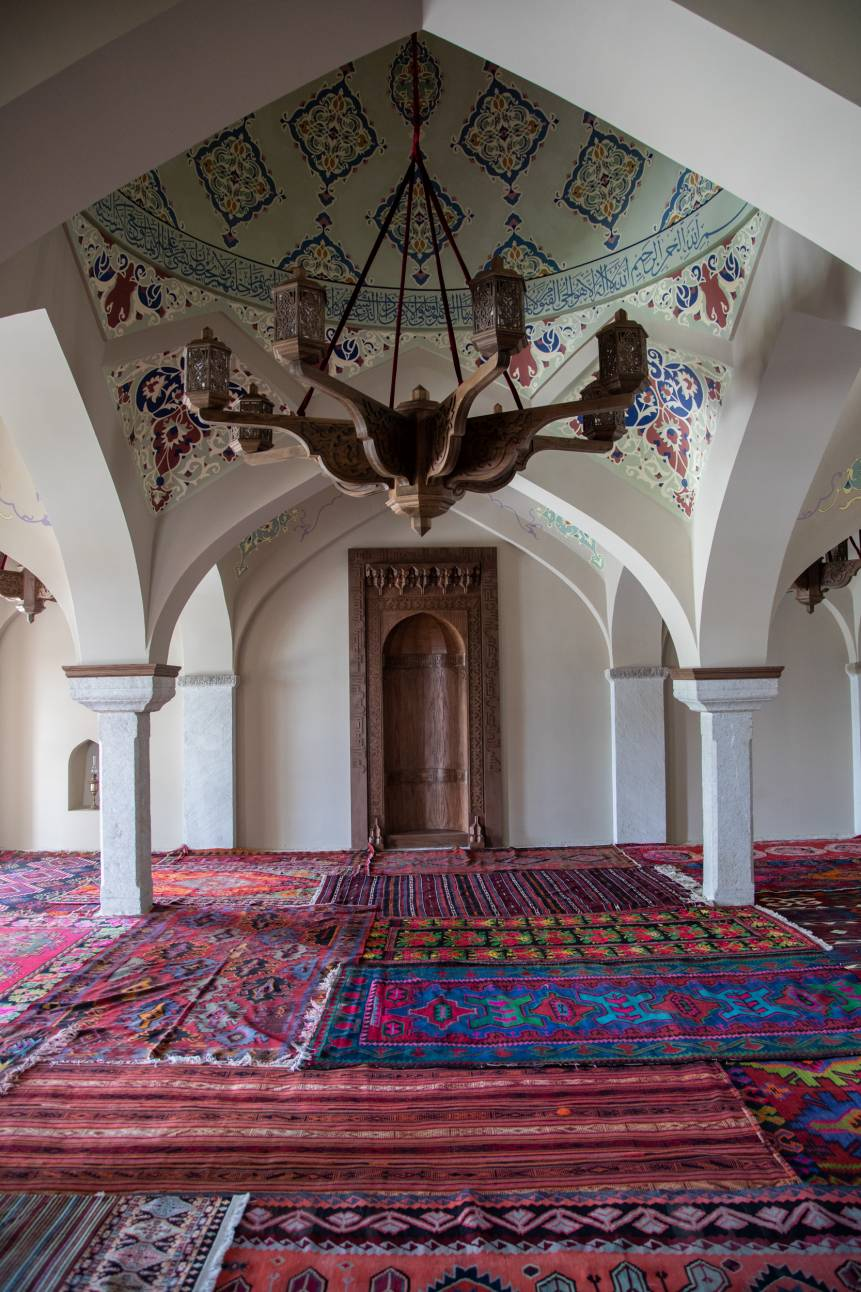
The interior of Mehmandarov's family mosque after restoration

N. Miklashevskaya also mentions the shebeke, which occupies the entire front wall of the Hall, which, in her words, is similar to the shebeke of the Sheki palace: "Shebeke, in combination with the small coloured glass, make up intricate patterns of stars and circles, and complete the original decor of the room".

She writes the following about the fireplace in the house: "Its design is typical for fireplaces in Shusha. The fireplace protrudes somewhat from the plane of the wall and has a quadrangular shape with a ledge at a height of 1.5 meters in the form of a breakdown; above it there is a small decorative square, on top of which, already directly on the wall, the fireplace ends with a painting of a bouquet of flowers. The furnace hole on the fireplace mirror is drawn with an intricate pointed arch. The fireplace is not richly decorated: a simple geometrized floral ornament prevails decorating its profiled stripes. In the lancet-shaped tympans of the firebox, the painting of stylized flowers is repeated on a blue background, which is common in the tympanum panels of the neighbouring room, as well as on the ceiling of the Hall. There is very little bronze paint in the paintings on the fireplace."

Along the ceiling of the Ceremonial Hall of the Mehmandarovs' house, there is a recess decorated with an interesting frieze. It is decorated with a composition of flowers and birds in the shape of a large medallion.

The plafond of the Mehmandarovs' house, from the point of view of the overall composition, reminds the ones of the Sheki khans' palace and the Shekihanovs' house, however, its patterns in their colours and compositions are closer to the motifs of carpet weaving. On the richly decorated carpets with a central medallion and a corner pattern, typical to the Karabakh school of carpet weaving, one can see an analogy of this composition.

== Gallery ==
Fragments of paintings on the interior of the house (work of Gambar Karabagi):

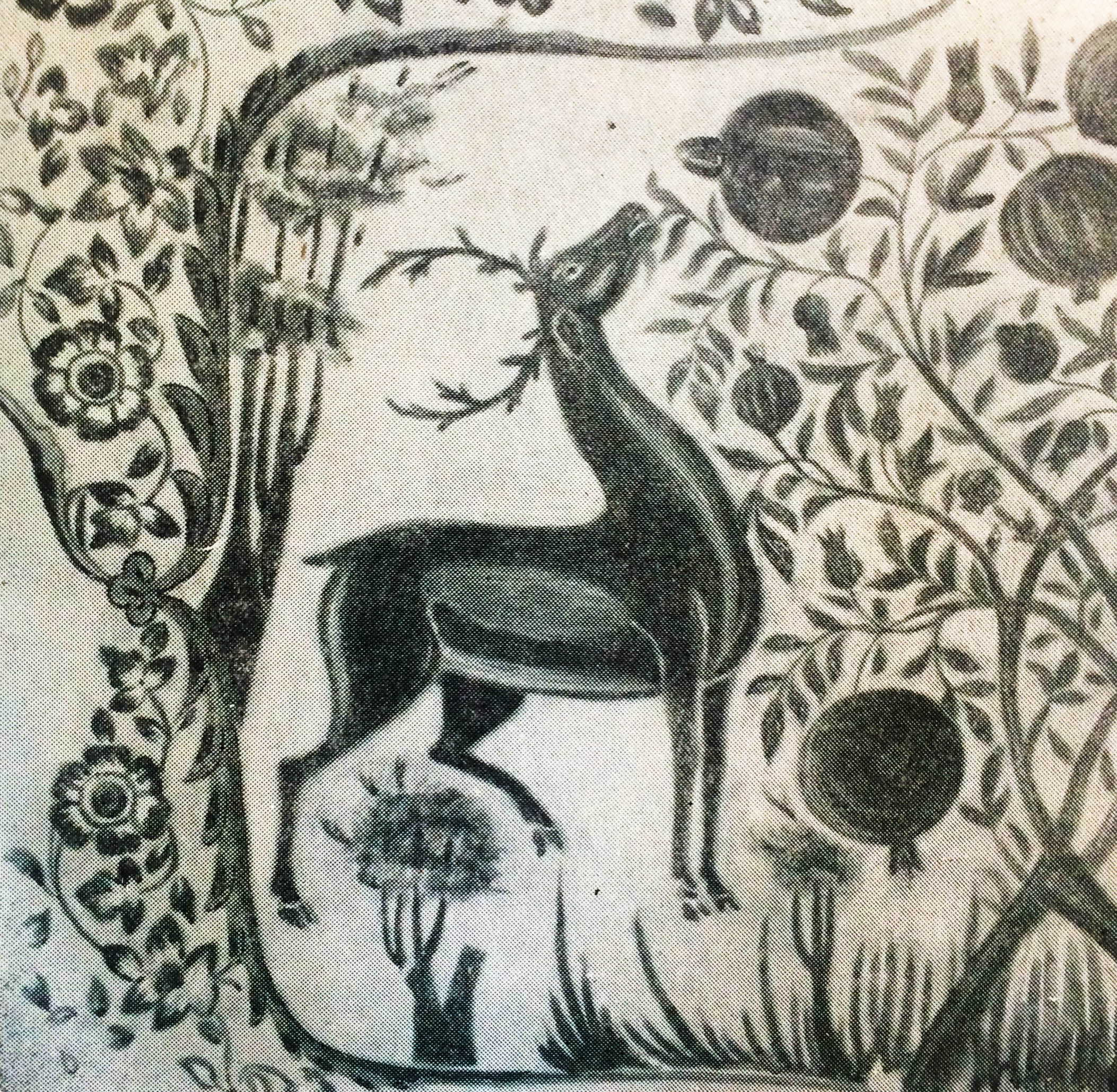
The deer and the pomegranate

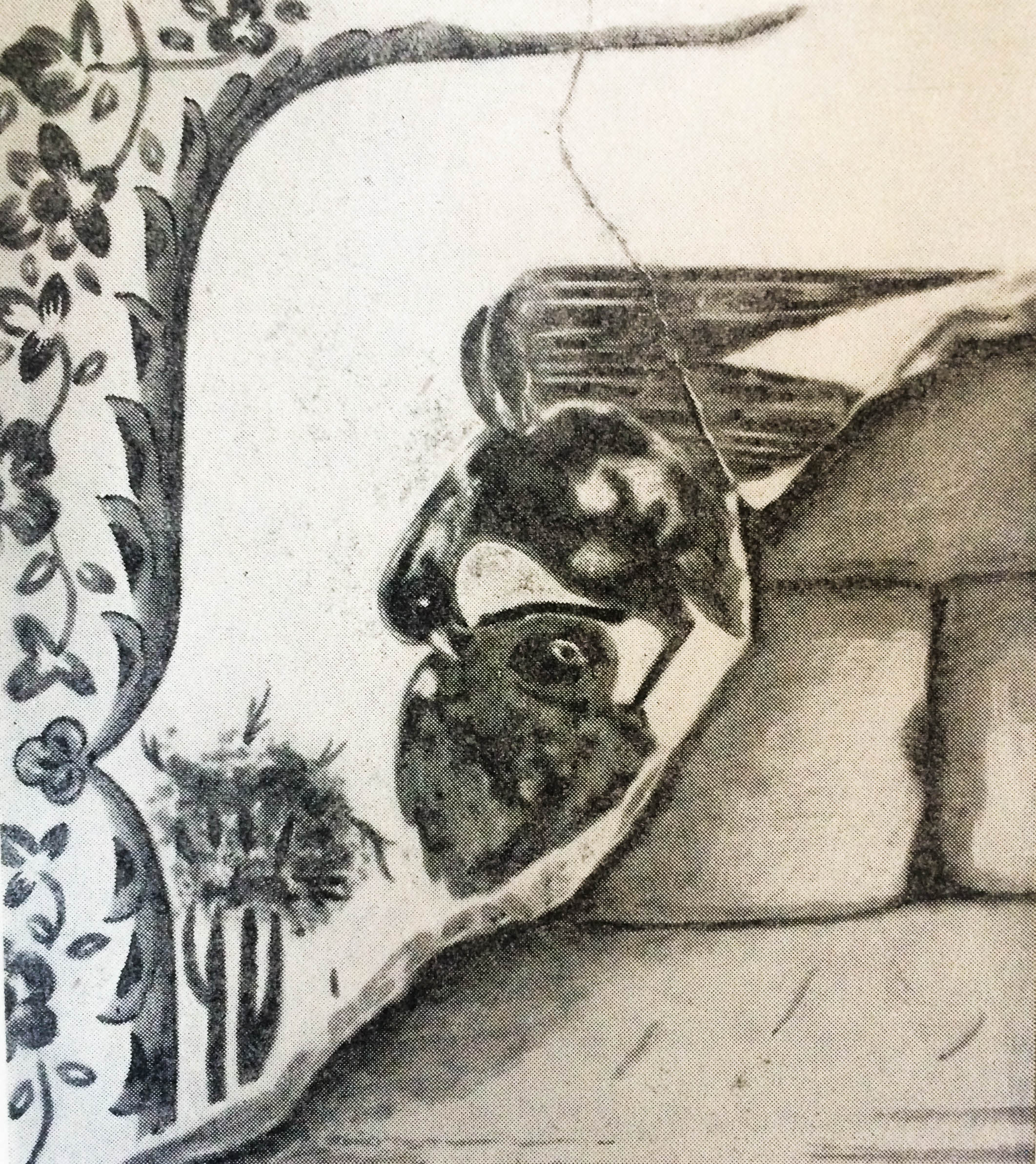
The eagle and the pheasant

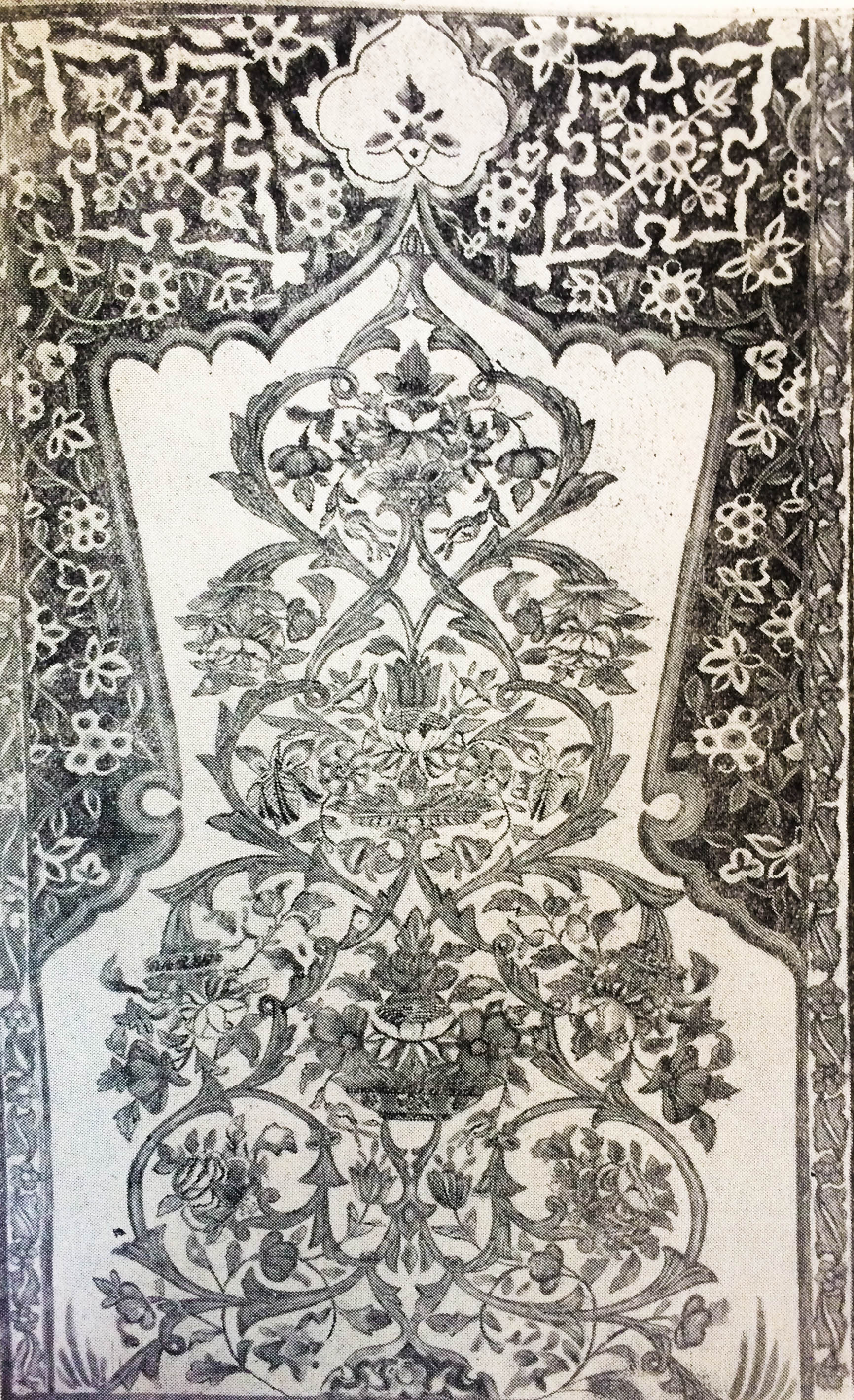
A stylized panel in the form of a bouquet
Fragments of the ceiling paintings in the interior of the house (work of Gambar Karabagi):

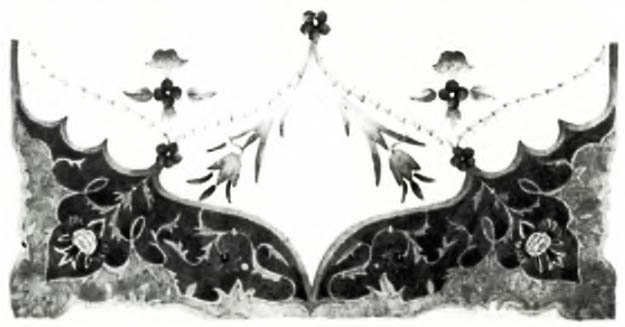

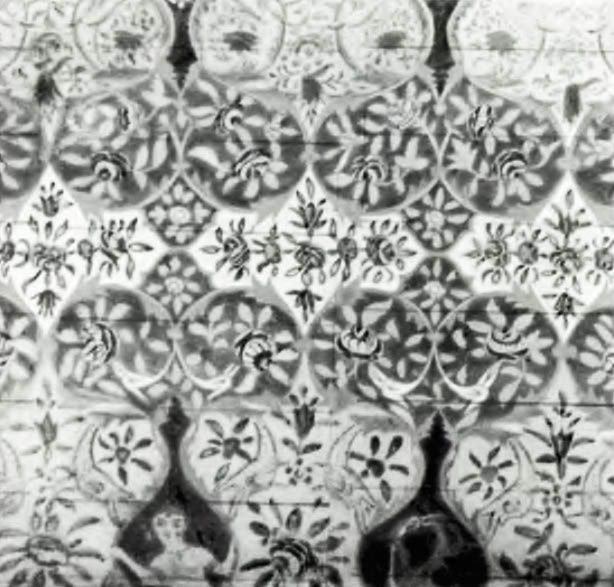

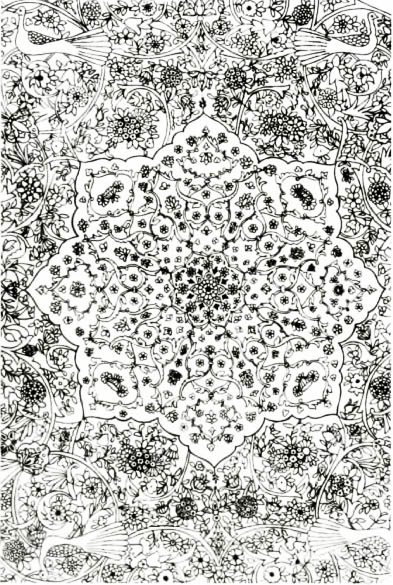

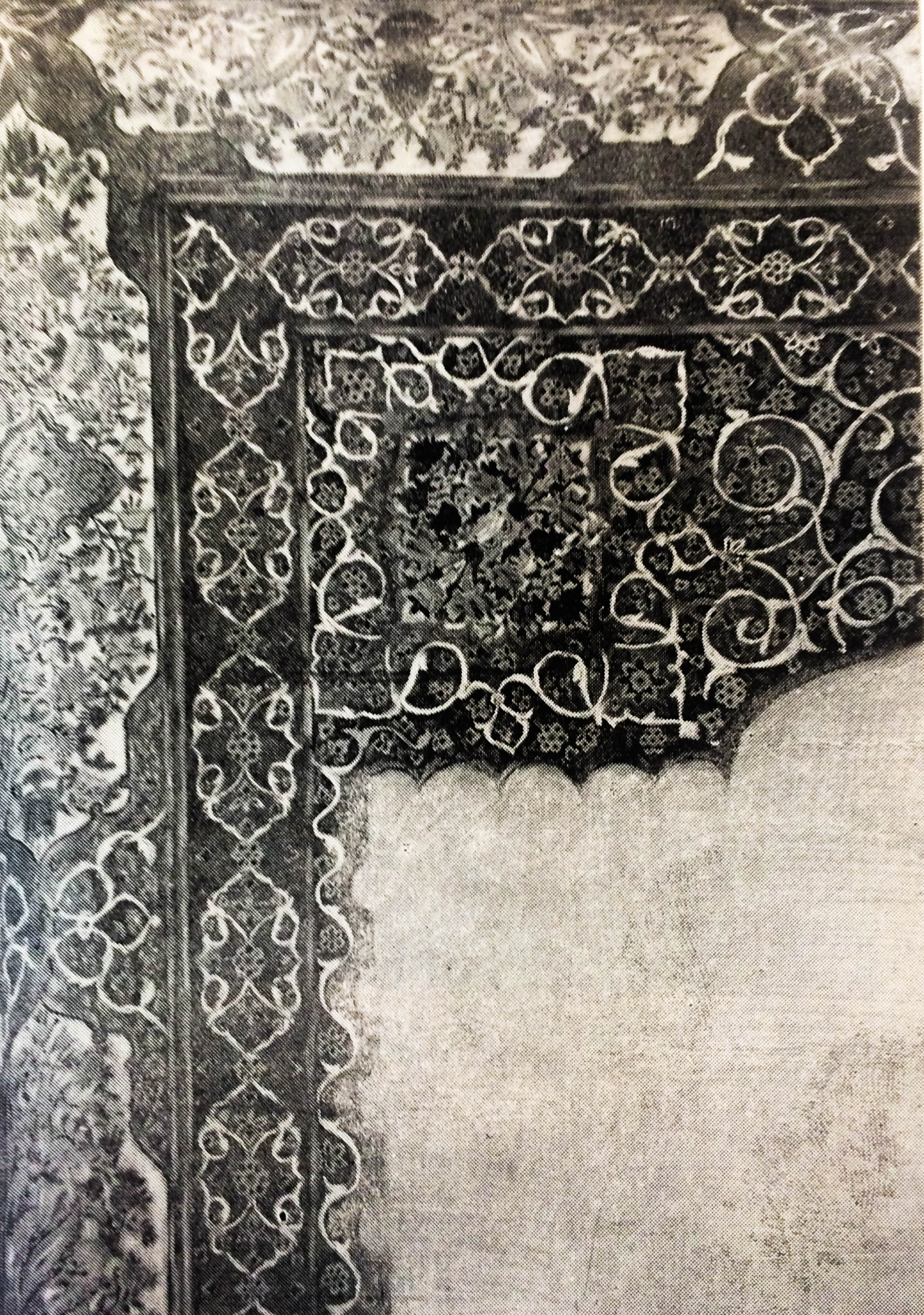

== See also ==
- Zohrabbayovs' house
- House of Khurshidbanu Natavan
- House of Uzeyir Hajibeyov

== Literature ==
- Avalov, Elturan (1977). Архитектура города Шуша и проблемы сохранения его исторического облика [The architecture of the city of Shusha and the problems of preserving its historical appearance]. Baku: Elm.
- Gasparyan, L.; Danielyan, E. (2022). Museums of the City of Shushi. Yerevan: History Museum of Armenia. pp. 189–190.
- Miklashevskaya, Natalya (1952). Архитектура Азербайджана. Очерки [Architecture of Azerbaijan. Essays]. Baku: Elm.
- Salamzade, Abdulvahab (1964). Архитектура Азербайджана XVI-XIX вв [Architecture of Azerbaijan XVI-XIX centuries]. Baku: Академия наук Азербайджанской ССР.
