= Usta Gambar Karabakhi =

Azerbaijani painter (1830s–1905)

- Born: Usta Qəmbər Qarabağı; 1830s Shusha, Karabakh, Azerbaijan
- Died: 1905; Shusha, Karabakh, Azerbaijan
- Known for: Artist

Usta Gambar Karabakhi (Azerbaijani: Usta Qəmbər Qarabağı; c. 1830–1905) was an Azerbaijani ornamentalist painter known for his decorative wall paintings featuring egg tempera plant and zoomorphic motifs. His works are found in the Palace of Shaki Khans, as well as in private residences in Shusha, including the houses of Rustamov, Safi bey, and Mehmandarov.

== Biography ==
Usta Gambar Karabakhi was a decorative artist known for his contributions to the tradition of wall painting. His work is characterized by intricate compositions and rich color schemes, often incorporating detailed plant motifs. These compositions frequently included stylized depictions of animals and fantastical creatures interwoven with floral and vegetal designs. Karabakhi’s paintings maintained the flatness of the wall surface while emphasizing the architectural elements of the space.

In his later works, Karabakhi preserved the techniques of traditional decorative painting while introducing a more realistic approach to certain graphic motifs. One of his most notable pieces is located in the Mehmandarov House in Shusha, where he painted a scene featuring deer and a pomegranate tree. This work is recognized for its expressive forms and dynamic composition. Karabakhi’s artistic approach combined established, canonized design schemes with direct observation from nature.

== Gallery ==
Paintings on the walls of the Palace of Shaki Khans
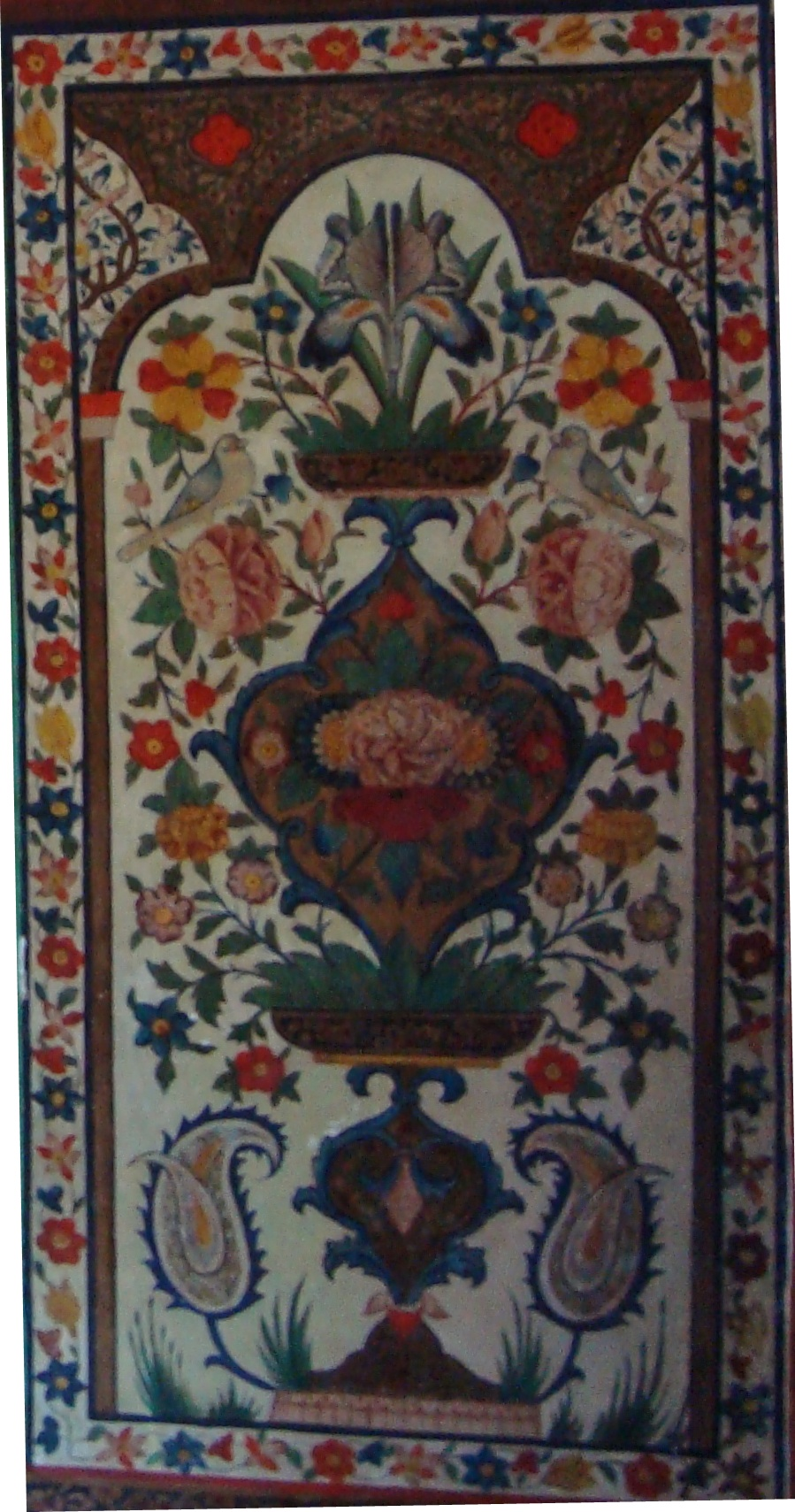

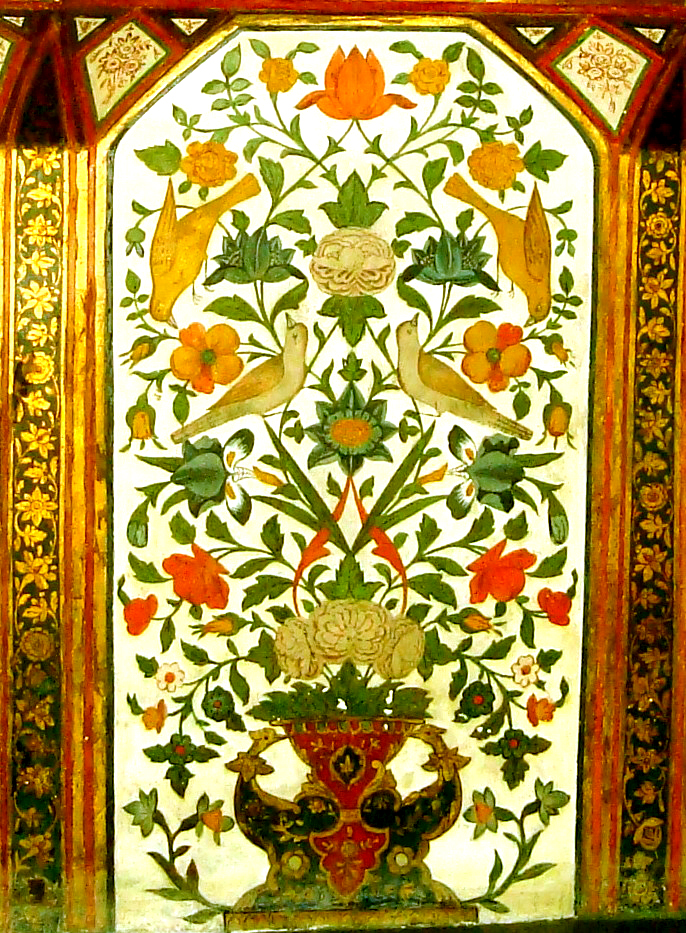

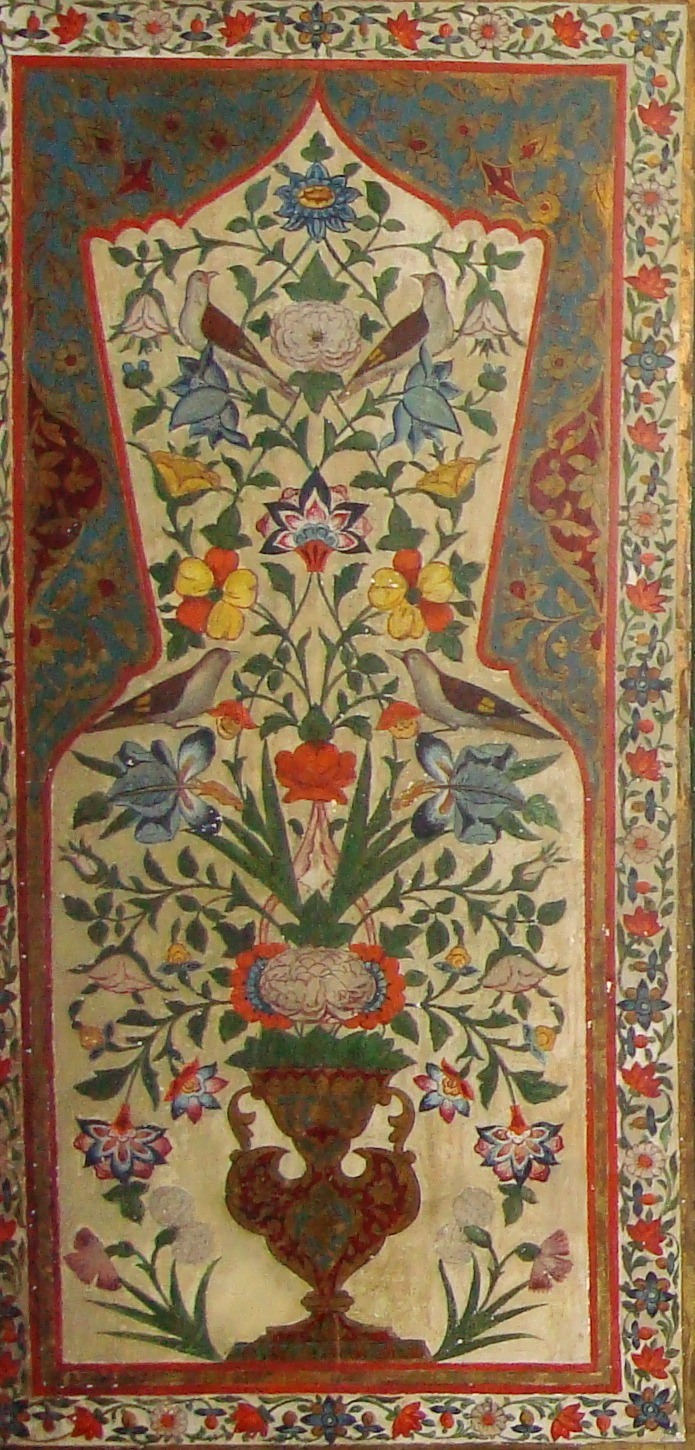

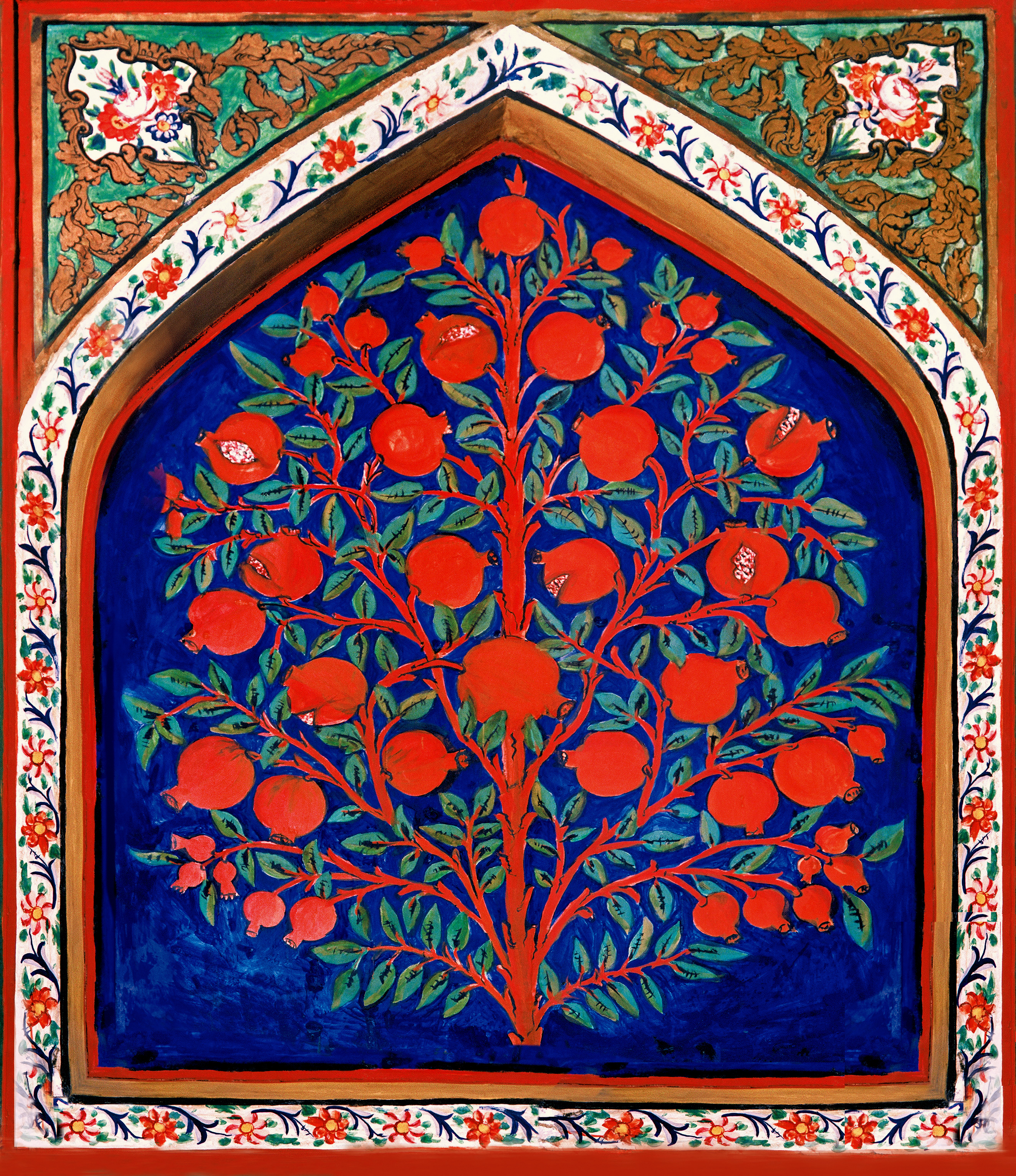

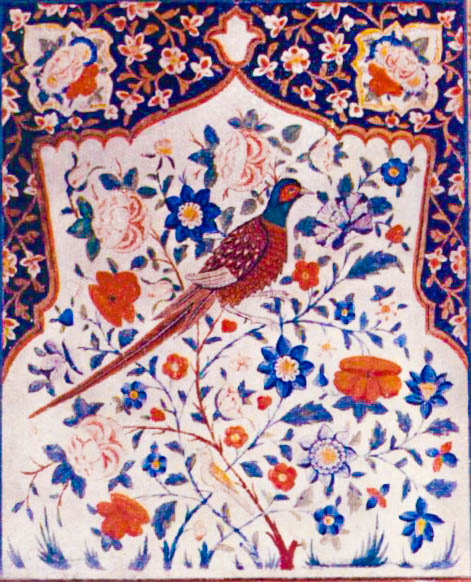

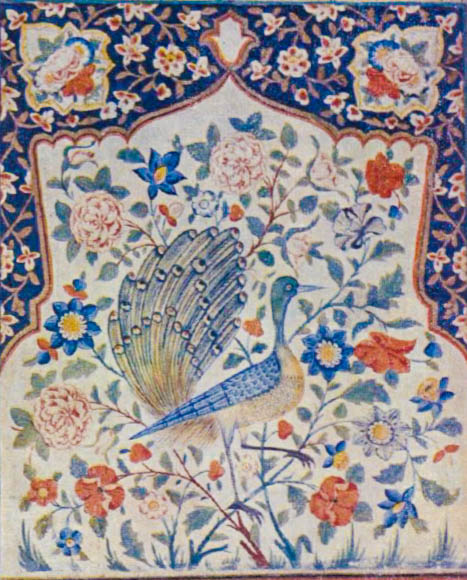

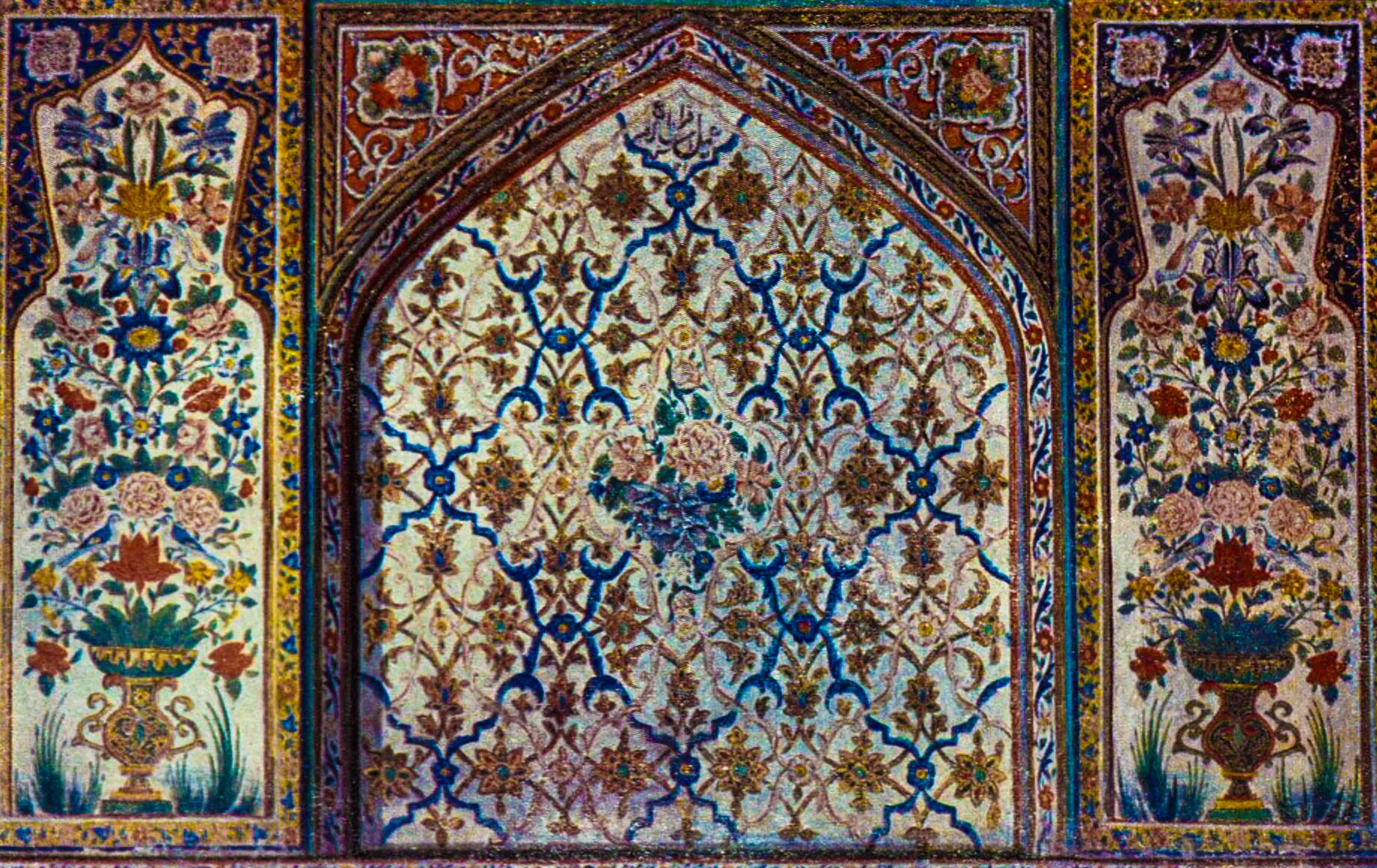

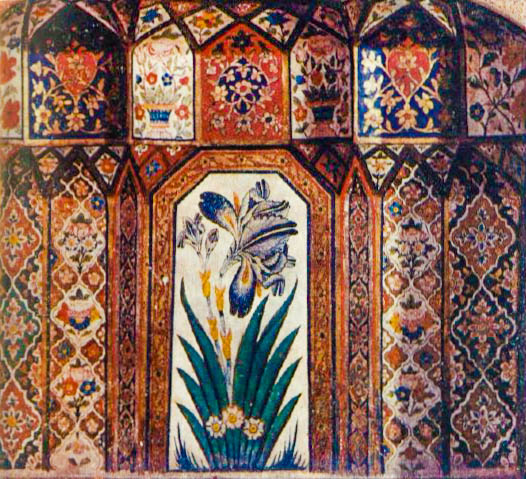

== See also ==
- List of Azerbaijani painters
