= Zohrabbayovs' house =

19th-century building

- Azerbaijani: Zöhrabbəyovun evi
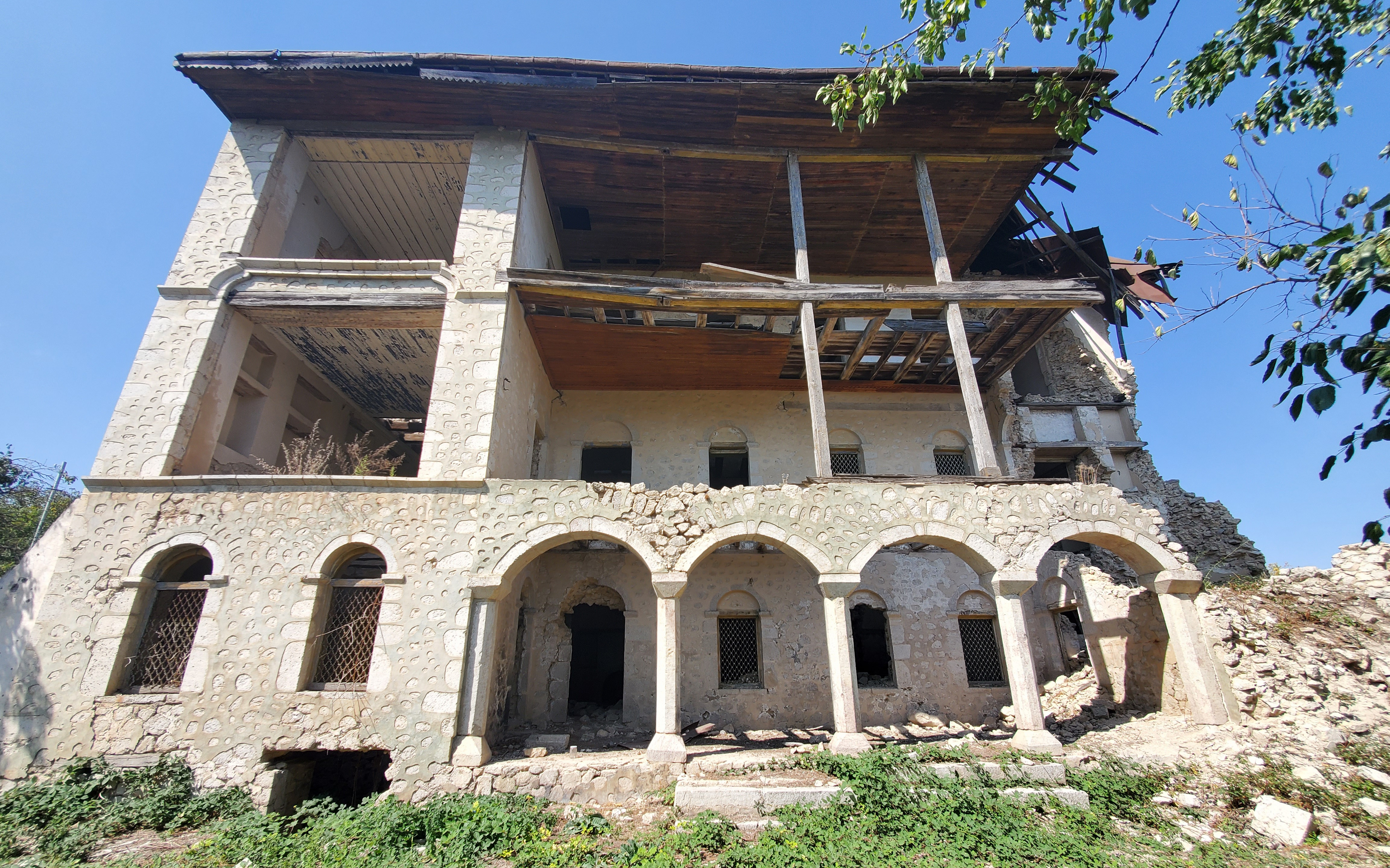
- Interactive map of the Zohrabbayovs' house area

General information
- Location: Ojaggulu Musayev street, Shusha, Azerbaijan
- Coordinates: 39.75953°N 46.75617°E
- Completed: 19th century

Design and construction
- Architect: Karbalayi Safikhan Karabakhi

The Zohrabbayovs' house is a 19th-century building that belonged to the representative of the noble Shusha family of the Zohrabbayovs, to Abbasgulu bey Zohrabbayov.

== History ==
The owner of the house, Abbasgulu bey Zohrabbayov (born in 1868 in Shusha), was a merchant of the second guild in the Russian Empire. The construction of the house began by his father, Mirza Akbar bey Zohrabbayov. After this death, Abbasgulu bey completed the construction. The huge and wide glazed veranda (Shushebend) of the house was completely decorated with antique drawings. On each floor, there was a hall with a capacity of 200–250 people, a veranda, a bedroom, a nursery, a steam kitchen, a toilet, and sewerage lines. Masters from Iran and Turkey were involved in the construction, the architect was Karbalayi Safikhan Karabakhi, a native from Karabakh.

After the Soviet occupation, Abbasgulu bey's house was confiscated, so he and his family moved to Baku. The house was subsequently converted into an art gallery.

After the capture of the city of Shusha by the Armenian armed forces on 8 May 1992, the building was plundered; the valuable decorations of the house, including stained glass mirrors (shabaka) and wall paintings, disappeared. Due to 28 years of occupation, the building was in disrepair, and it was destroyed.

== Gallery ==
Condition of the house after the Armenian occupation:

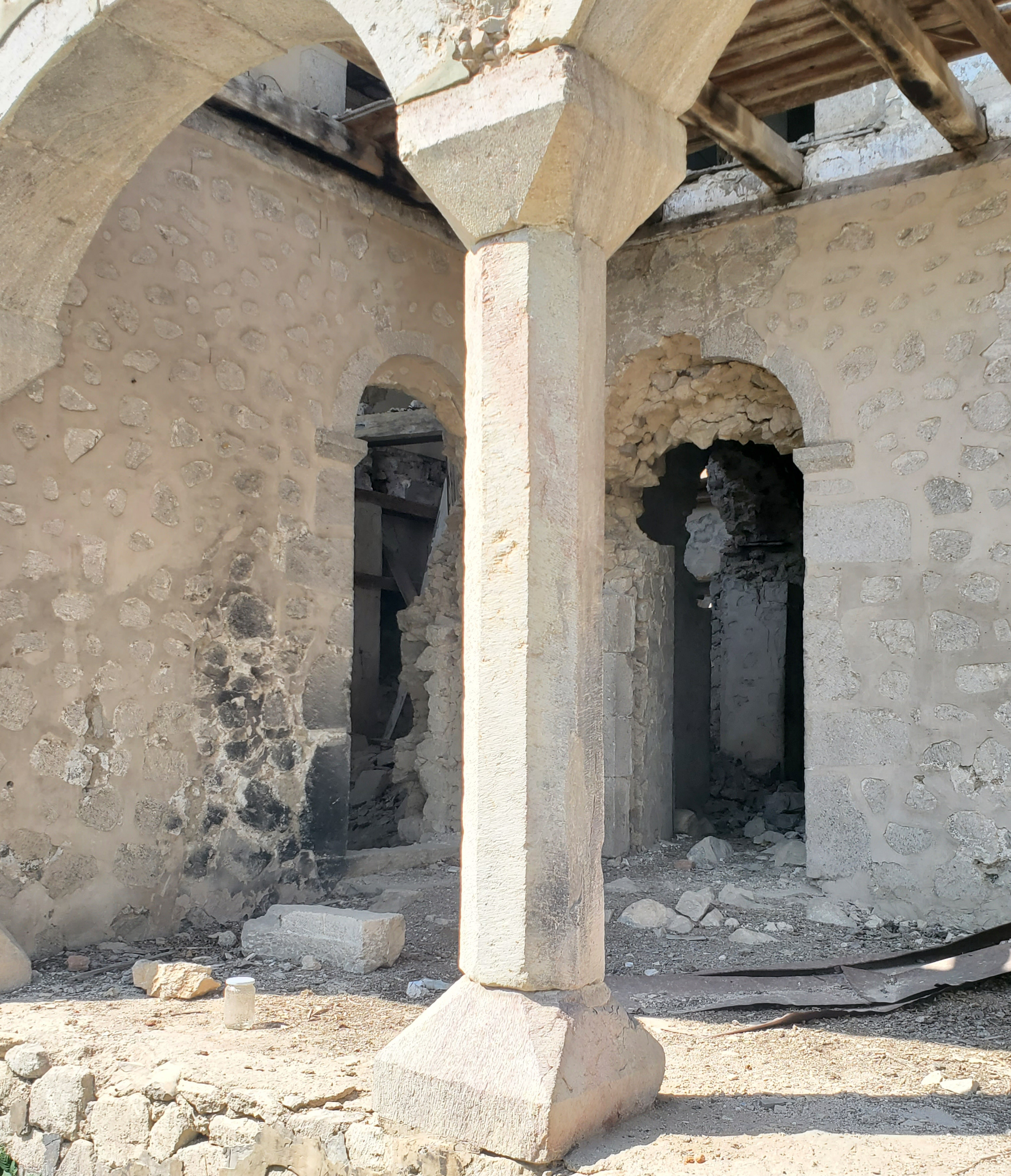

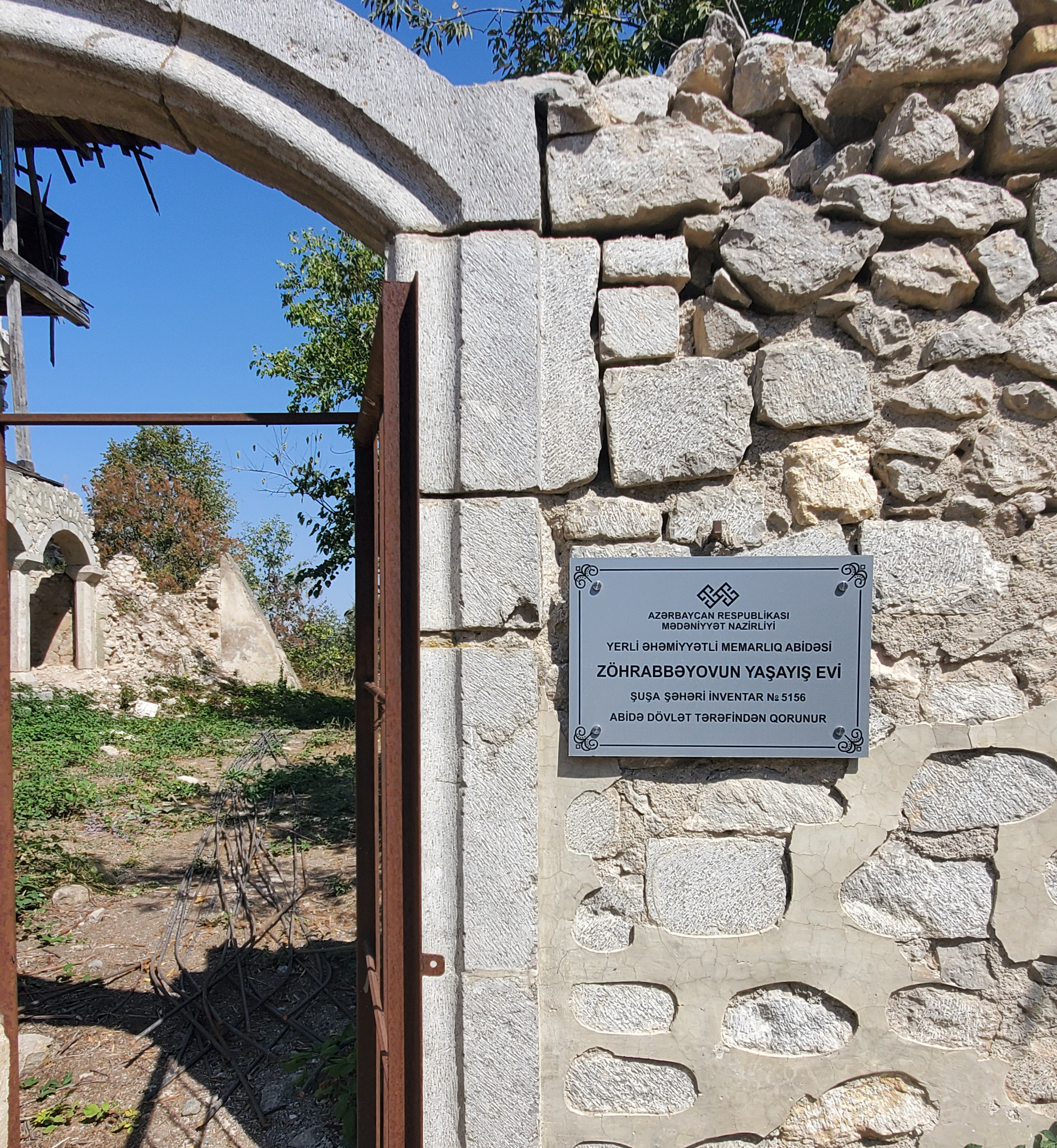

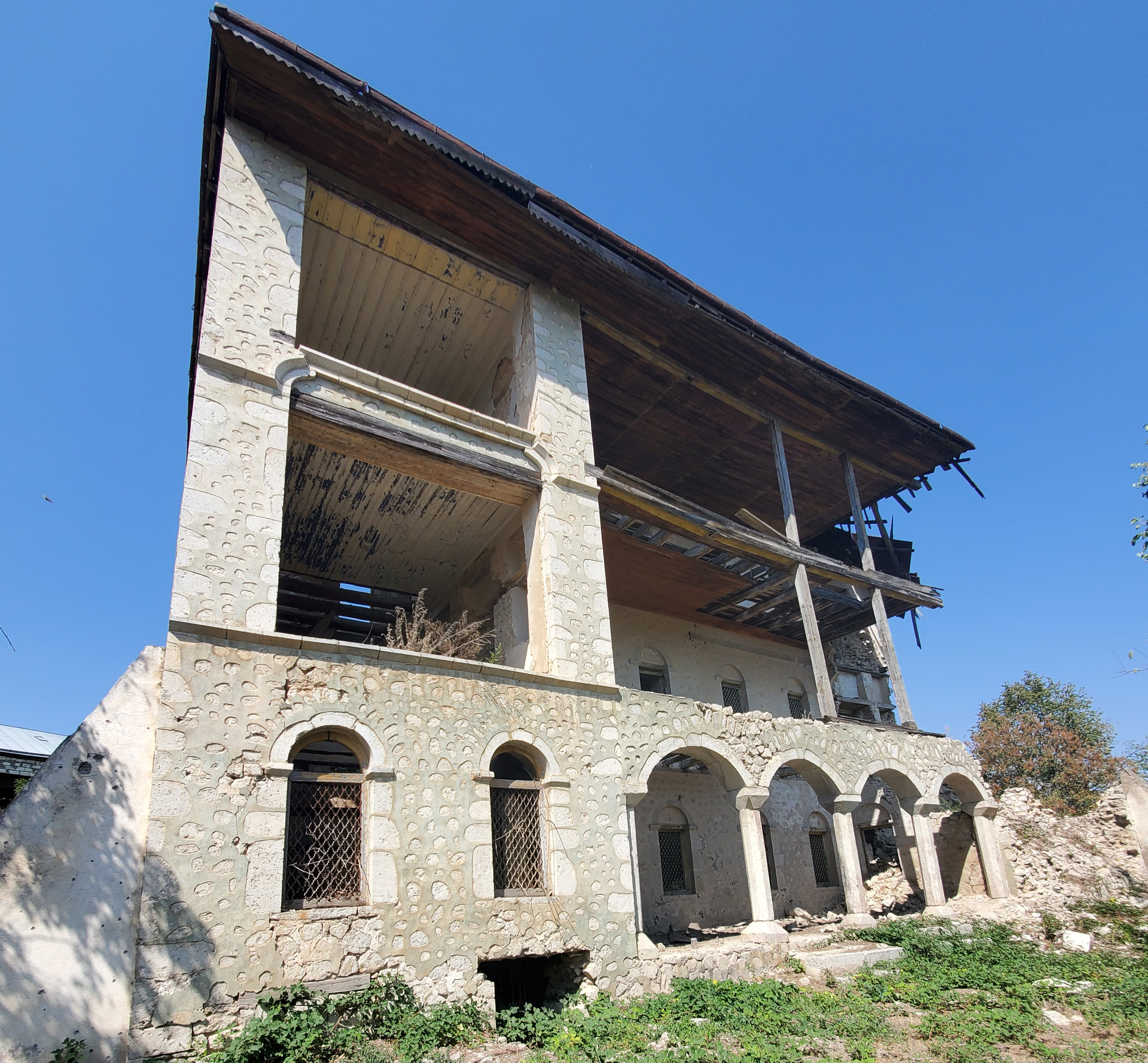

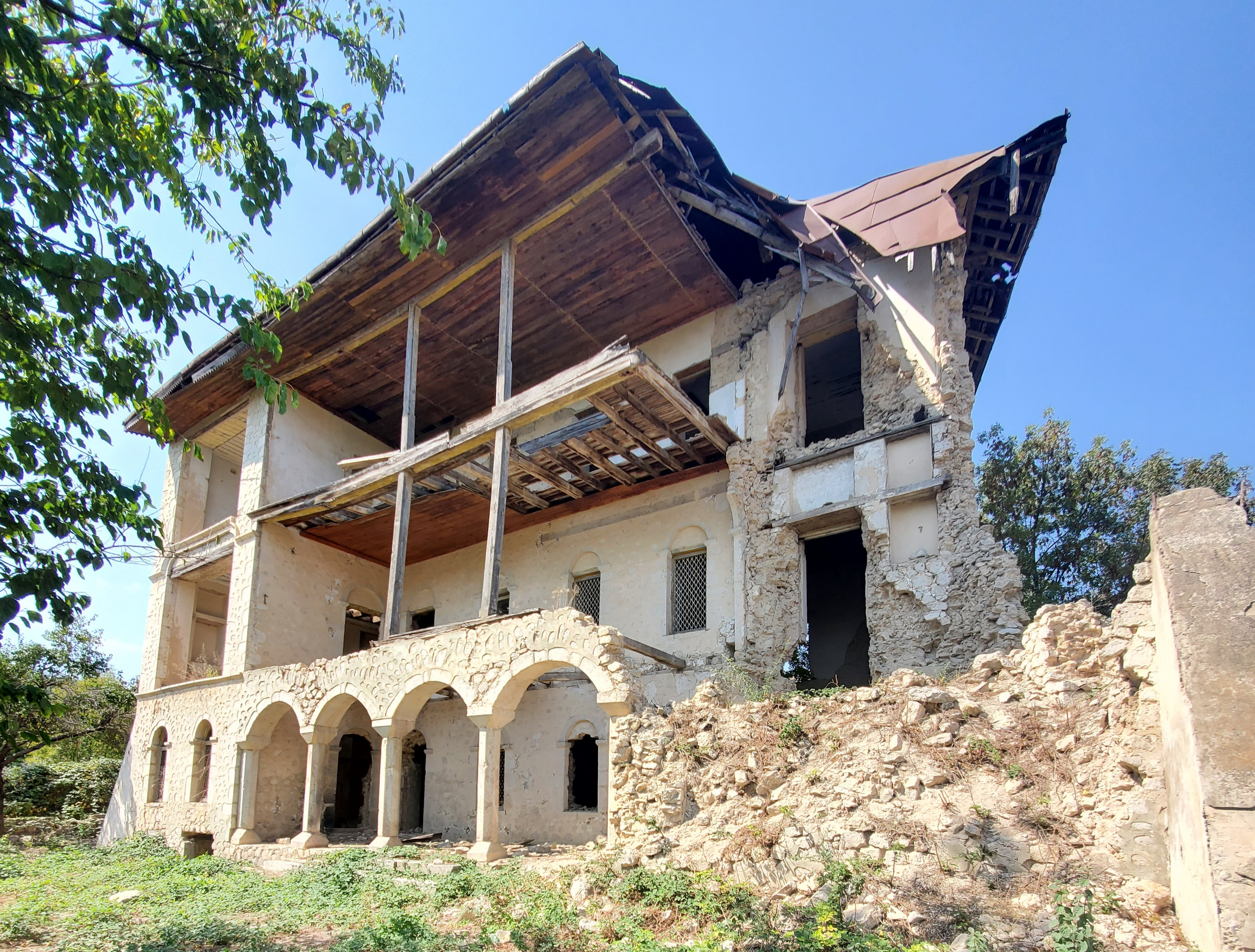

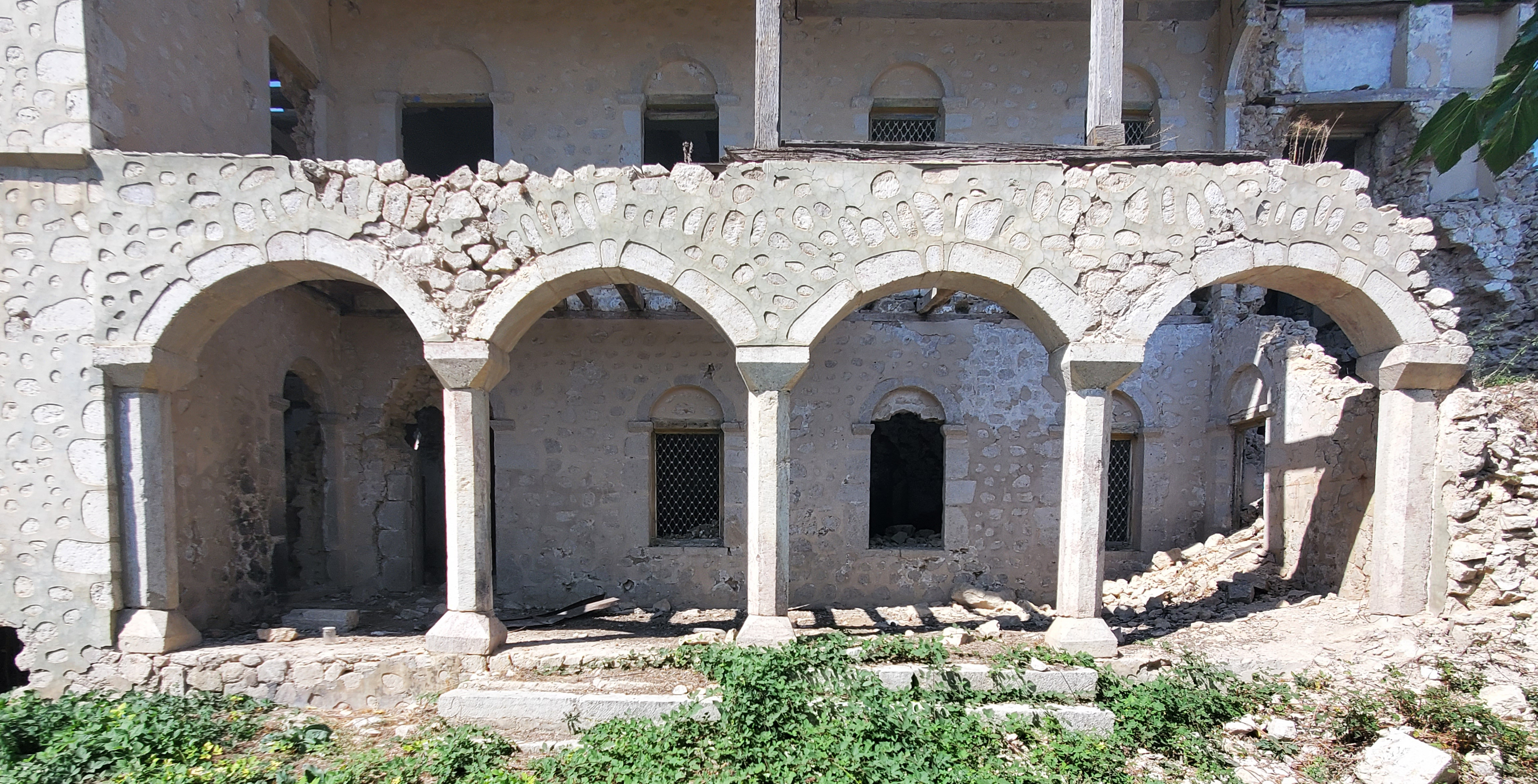

== See also ==
- House of Khurshidbanu Natavan
