= Elturan Avalov =

Azerbaijani artist (born 1940)

- Born: 20 August 1940 (age 84); Baku, Azerbaijan SSR, USSR
- Education: Azerbaijan Polytechnic Institute
- Notable work: The Architecture of Shusha
- Parents: Vali Avalov (father); Mahbuba Ismayılova (mother)
- Awards: Honored Art Worker of Azerbaijan

Elturan Veli oglu Avalov (Azerbaijani: Elturan Vəli oğlu Avalov; born August 20, 1940) is an Azerbaijani artist, Honored Art Worker of Azerbaijan (1991), professor (2003). He is a full member of the Eastern Countries International Academy of Architecture, the International Academy of Ecoenergetics, the Union of Azerbaijan Architects and the Union of Azerbaijan Artists.

== Biography ==
Elturan Avalov was born in Baku in 1940. In 1963, he graduated from the architecture faculty of the Azerbaijan Polytechnic Institute. In 1973, he defended it by writing a dissertation on "Architecture of the city of Shusha and preservation of its historical face". Later, in the graphic series called "Shusha" he described Panahali Khan's castle, Ganja Gate, Garaboyuk Khanim's Palace, Ibrahim Khalil Khan's Palace, Khan's Palace, Saatli Mosque, House of Mehmandarovs, Yukhari Govhar Agha Mosque, Ashaghi Govhar Agha Mosque, House of Khurshidbanu Natavan, Khurshidbanu Natevan's caravanserai, the Khan Gizi spring, Molla Panah Vagif's mausoleum and up to 50 monuments in total with brush and pen technique.

He is the author of the books The Architecture of Shusha (1977), Elturan (1986), The Architect's Eyes (1978). In 1991, he was awarded the title of Honored Art Worker of the Republic of Azerbaijan. He is a participant in more than 30 exhibitions. Individual exhibitions were held in Baku (1985, 1994, 2005), Moscow (1986), Turkey (1999). In 1985, an individual exhibition of the artist dedicated to the 100th anniversary of Uzeyir Hajibeyli, the founder of professional music in Azerbaijan, was held in Moscow. 100 of his graphic works were displayed at the exhibition. In 2003, he was given the title of professor. Currently, he is the head of the "Fine arts" department of the Azerbaijan University of Architecture and Construction. Since 2005, he has been a member of Azerbaijan Union of Artists, since 2006 Azerbaijan "Caricature Artists Union", Azerbaijan group of FECO. In addition, he is a full member of the International Academy of Architecture of the Eastern Countries, the International Academy of Ecoenergetics, and a member of the Union of Architects of Azerbaijan.

He has published more than 60 scientific books and articles on the problems of the history of architecture and art of Azerbaijan, and more than 500 of his graphic works have been published in Baku, Vilnius, Tashkent, Kyiv, Moscow, Kazan, Riga and Strasbourg.

He drew illustrations for works of Azerbaijani classics and grotesque caricatures for folk songs. Portraits of "Haji Murad", "Composer Fikret Amirov", "Sevil", "Oilmen" are also distinguished among his works in a realistic style. Apart from that, he also painted paintings for Uzeyir Hajibeyli's operettas Arshin Mal Alan and If Not That One, Then This One.

On October 12, 2020, on the occasion of the 270th anniversary of the Shusha fortress, a virtual exhibition of the graphic series drawn by Elturan Avalov about Shusha was opened under the organization of the Ministry of Culture and the Azerbaijan State Art Gallery.

== Books ==
- The Architecture of Shusha (1977)
- Through the eyes of an architect (1978)
- The Teller (1986)

== Family ==
His father, Vali Avalov, was a Meskhetian Turk. He taught at the Azerbaijan Institute of Civil Engineers.

His mother, Mahbuba Ismayilova, was an honored engineer of Azerbaijan.
