= Palace of Karabakh Khans =

Historic palace in Shusha, Azerbaijan

- Azerbaijani: Qarabağ xanlarının sarayı Persian: کاخ خان های قره باغ
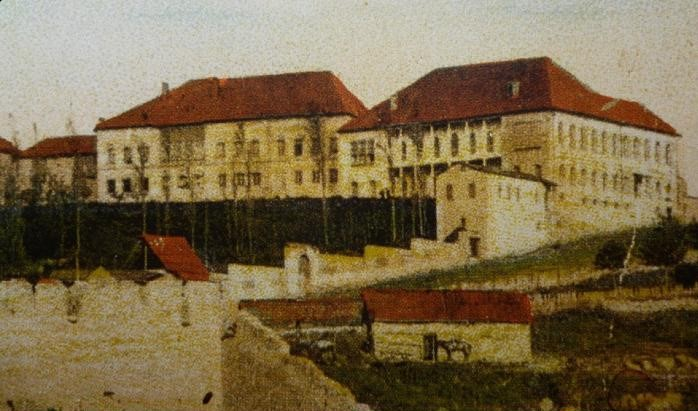

- Location within Azerbaijan

General information
- Type: Palace
- Architectural style: Architecture of Azerbaijan
- Location: Shusha, Azerbaijan
- Coordinates: 39.766111°N 46.751111°E
- Completed: XVIII-XIX centuries
- Client: Karabakh Khanate

The Palace of the Karabakh Khans (Azerbaijani: Qarabağ xan sarayı; Persian: کاخ خان های قره باغ), or the Palace of Panah Ali Khan is a palace located in the historical center of the city of Shusha, the former residence of the founder of the Karabakh Khanate, Panah Ali Khan. During the reign of Panah Ali Khan, the palace was also the residence of the ruler where he lived together with his family. His son, Ibrahimkhalil Khan, together with his family and followers settled in the Palace of Ibrahimkhalil Khan built in the same period. For the eldest son of Ibrahimkhalil Khan, Mukhammedhasan Agha, another palace was built on a sheer cliff in the southeast of the Shusha plateau. In addition to these palaces, the Palace of the Khan's daughter, Natavan, and the Palace of Gara Boyuk khanim, belonging to the Khan's family, were also built in Shusha. Although in various sources the name of the Palace of the Karabakh Khan is attributed to each of these buildings, the main political residence of the Karabakh Khans was the palace-castle of the first Karabakh Khan, Panah Ali Khan.

== History ==
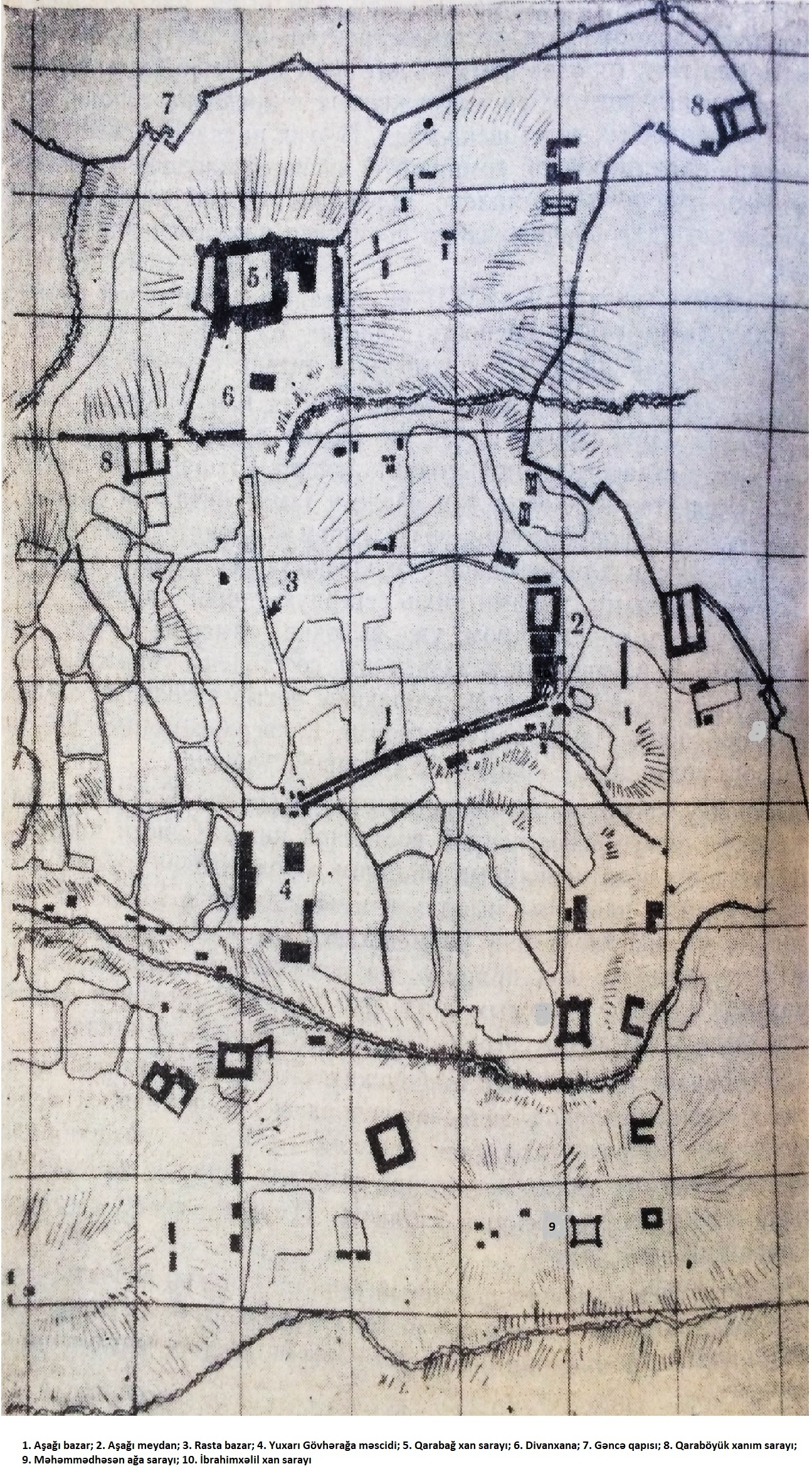
Palace of the Karabakh Khans' location in the historical center of the city of Shusha's plan

Almost all cities of the feudal period were characterized by the presence of the fortified citadels built within on naturally protected hills. These citadels, being the architectural and planning dominant, housed the palace complex, fortifications and other structures designed to serve the ruler and to ensure his safety. In the 16-18th centuries, the rulers’ citadel was called Icheri Gala (the inner fortress), sometimes Bala Gala (the small fortress) or Ark (as, for example the citadel of Tabriz).

Usually building of a feudal city began with the ruler's citadel. During the construction of Shusha, due to the exceptionally peculiar and strategic advantageous qualities of the Shusha plateau, apparently, the construction of the castles, including the palace of Panah Ali Khan, was carried out simultaneously with raising the defensive walls of the fortress. In practice, for securing the fortress, it was enough to strengthen only the northern side of the plateau with defensive walls. Platon Zubov writes:

Shusha was created as if by magic: the already existing high stone walls with formidable loopholes and towers were raised from the side of the Ganja road, and the small quadrangular castles, in which Panah Khan settled with his adherents, appeared inside the fortress.

The construction of the fortress, according to Baharly, a Karabakh historian, began from the less rugged eastern part of the plateau. This, as notes E. Avalov, is confirmed by the undated master plan of the city of Shusha, which he believes was carried out in the first third of the 19th century. The plan reveals the Shusha castles were located on the eastern part of the plateau and were raised, as usual, on natural barriers - on hills or on the edge of sheer cliffs. These castles were harmoniously combined with the natural landscape, playing the role of architectural dominants.

According to Mirza Adygozal bey, during the reign of Panah Ali Khan, “spacious houses and high palaces” were built in Shusha for the members of the Khan's family.

Mir Mehdi Khazani, a Karabakh historian, wrote that Panah Ali Khan raised “a palace like a small fortress with walls and towers” for himself, and next to his residence, on a hill, he built a “beautiful palace” for his son Ibrahimkhalil.

Only two castles located in the southeastern part of Shusha have survived. One of them is the castle of Gara Boyuk Khanim, based on a hill, the second is the castle of Panah Ali Khan, which locates at the edge of a cliff, over a deep ravine.

== Architectural features ==
The architectural originality of the castles in the Shusha fortress attracted the attention of travelers and guests of the city. For example, in the middle of the 19th century, in the newspaper Kavkaz was noted:

Among the various houses and residential buildings of the city, the castles where the khan's family members live, immediately catch the eye: they are unique. They are surrounded by high walls with round towers at the corners.

Based on the undated master plan, almost all Shusha castles had the same configuration being rectangular in plan, and surrounded, on all four sides, by defensive walls with three-quarter towers at the corners. From the inside, the premises were attached to these walls serving as housing for the inhabitants of the castles. The volumetric-spatial and planning solution of the Shusha castles was created under the influence of the Shahbulag Castle' architecture.

The main entrances of the castles were facing north, similarly to the Shahbulag Castle, being protected from a direct access by prismatic gate towers with L-shaped passages extended outward. The upper parts of the Panah Ali Khan's Shusha castle have not been preserved. E. Avalov noted that in Panah Ali Khan's castle, as well as in the Shahbulag castle, and in the castle of Gara Boyuk Khanim, there was a two-story gate tower.

The two-story building of the palace contained numerous rooms, including a large T-shaped front hall which played the role of the building's compositional center. This hall was separated from the outer space by shebeke-windows, which were widely used in palace, residential and religious construction of the 18-19th centuries in Azerbaijan.

== Current state ==
Only parts of the walls remain of the Karabakh Khans Palace. During the Second Karabakh War, on 8 November 2020, the city of Shusha was captured and came under the control of the Azerbaijani Armed Forces. Currently, restoration work is undertaken here with the participation of Azerbaijani and foreign specialists.

== Gallery ==
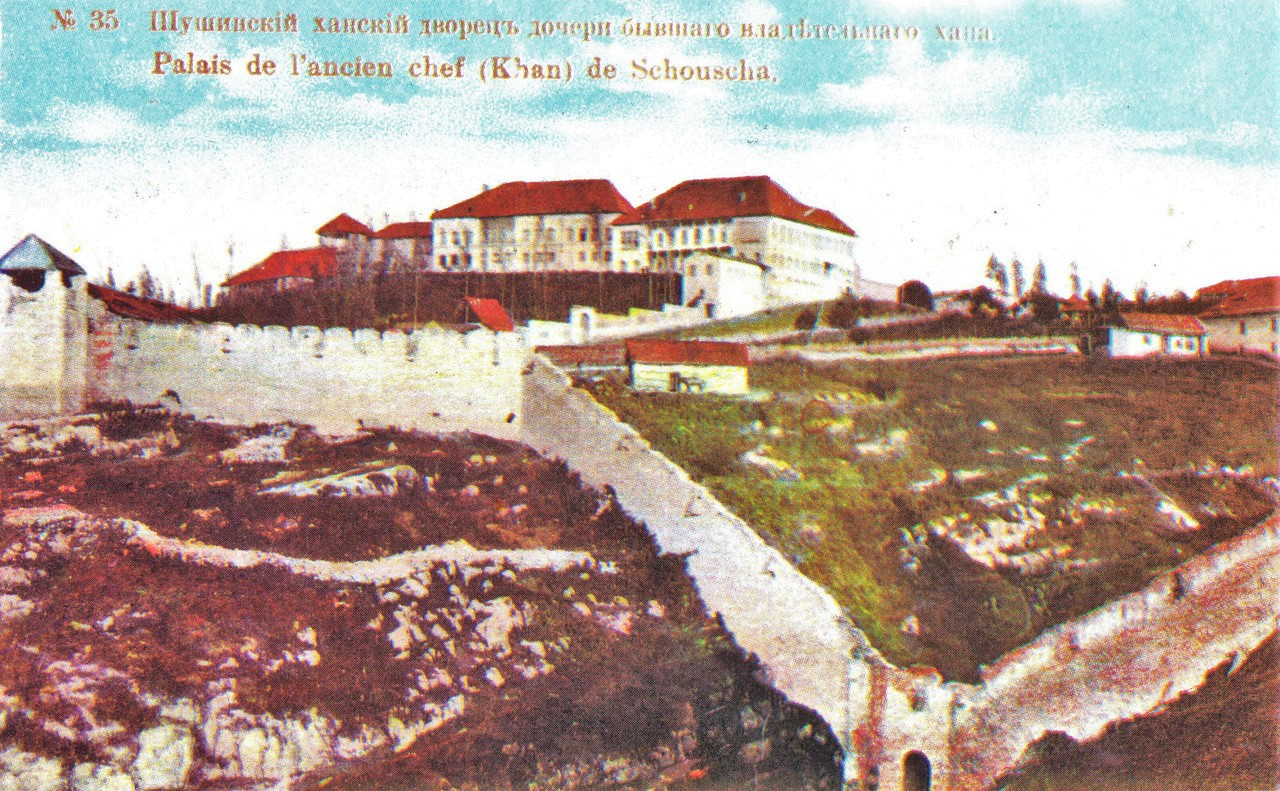
The Palace of the Karabakh Khans on a 19th-century postcard

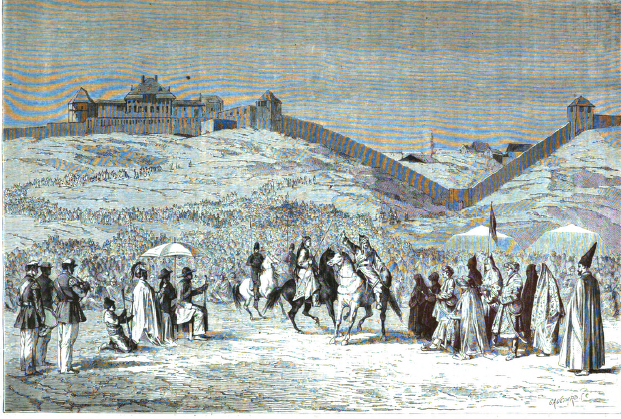
Vasily Vereshchagin - The end of a dramatic performance (1865). The Shusha fortress and the Khan's Palace are visible on the background.

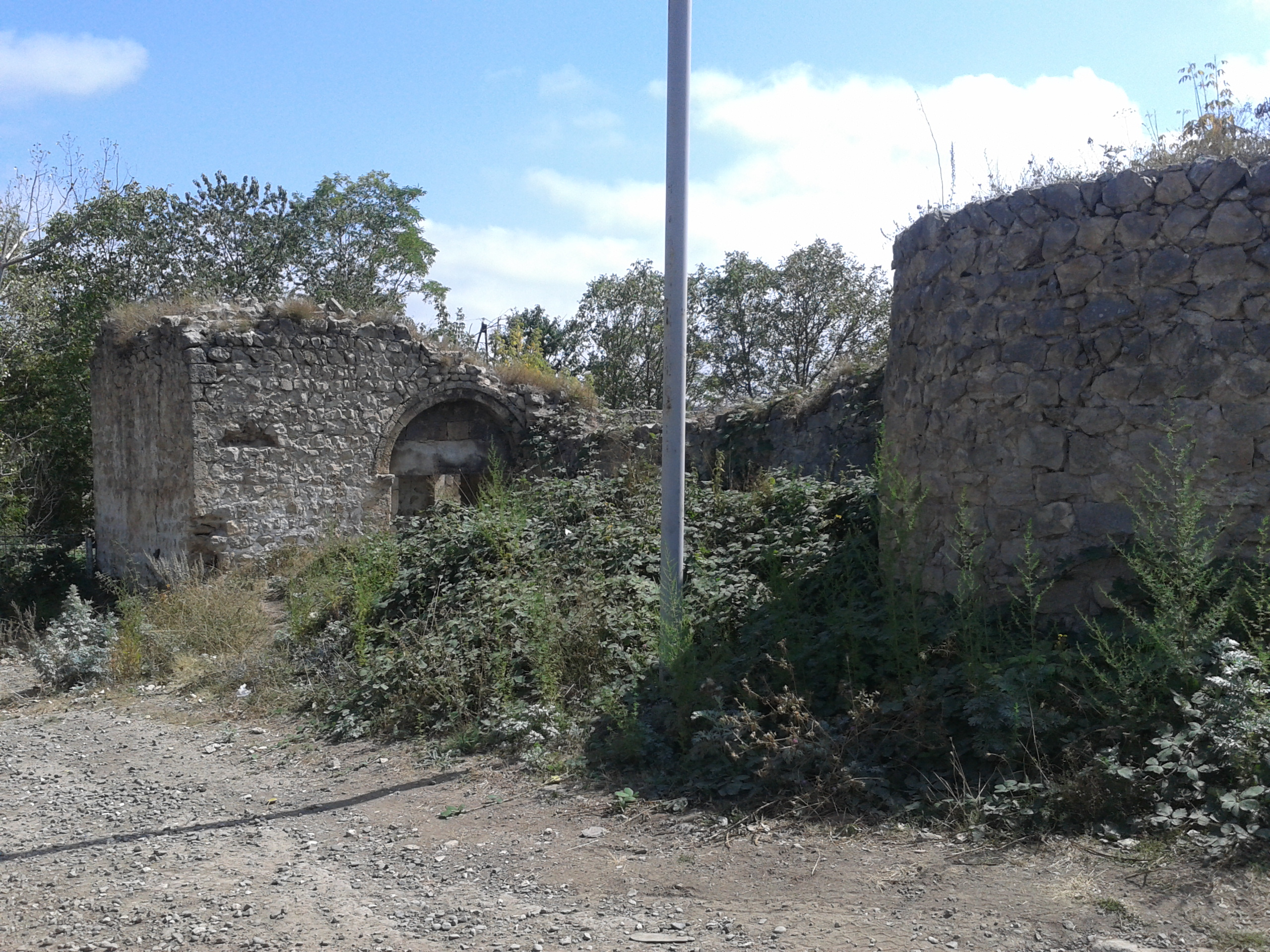
Remains of the walls

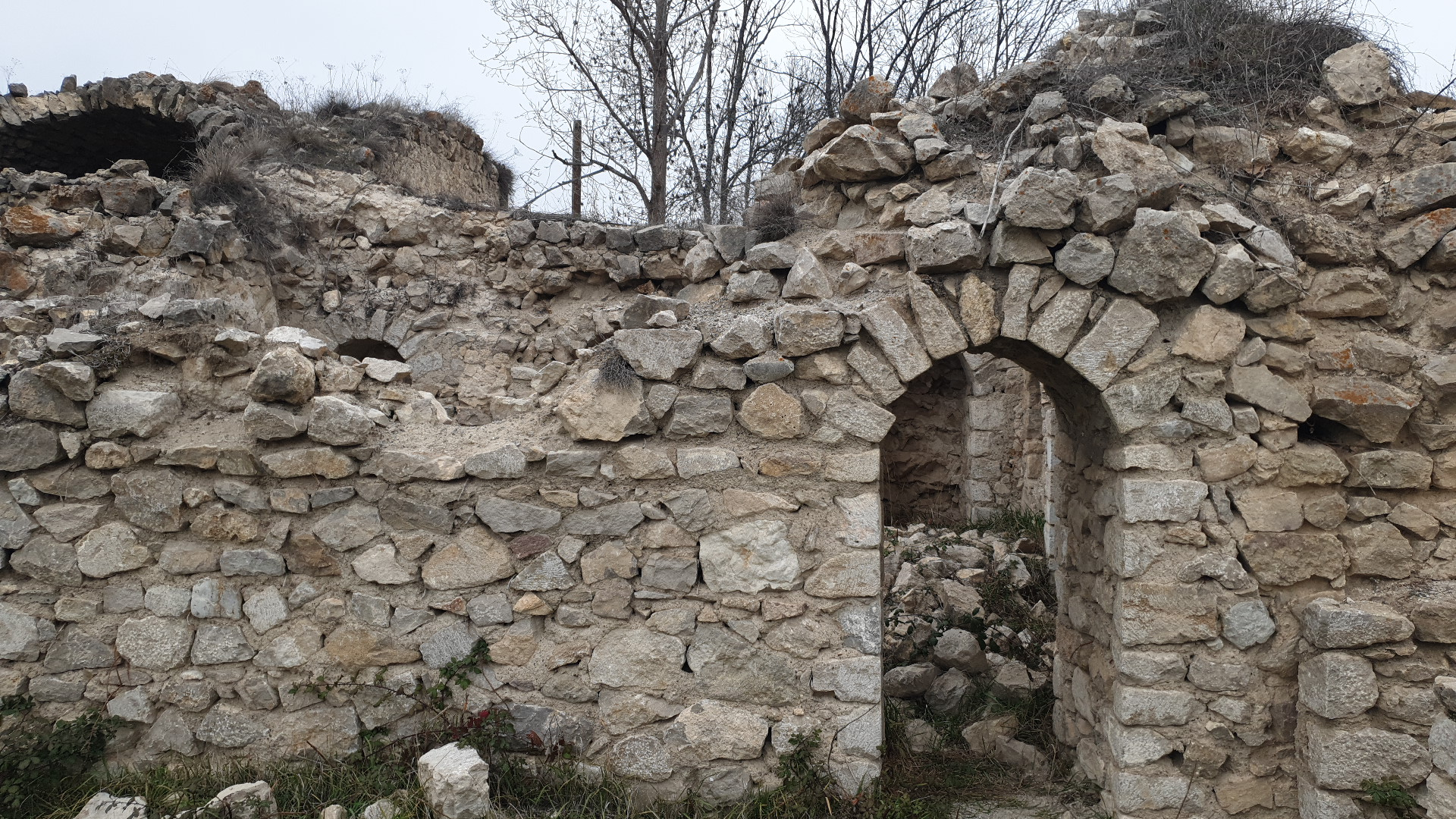

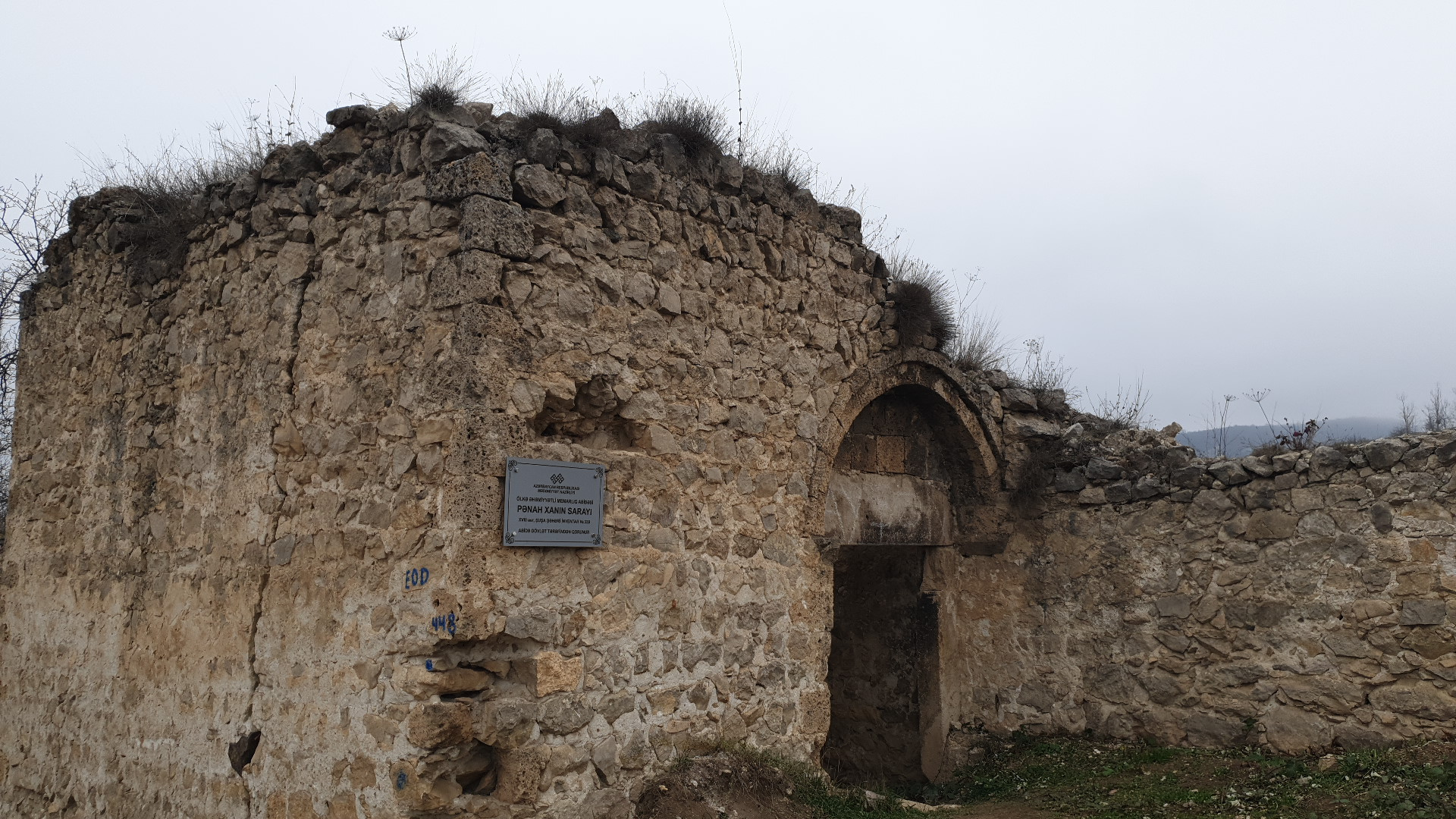

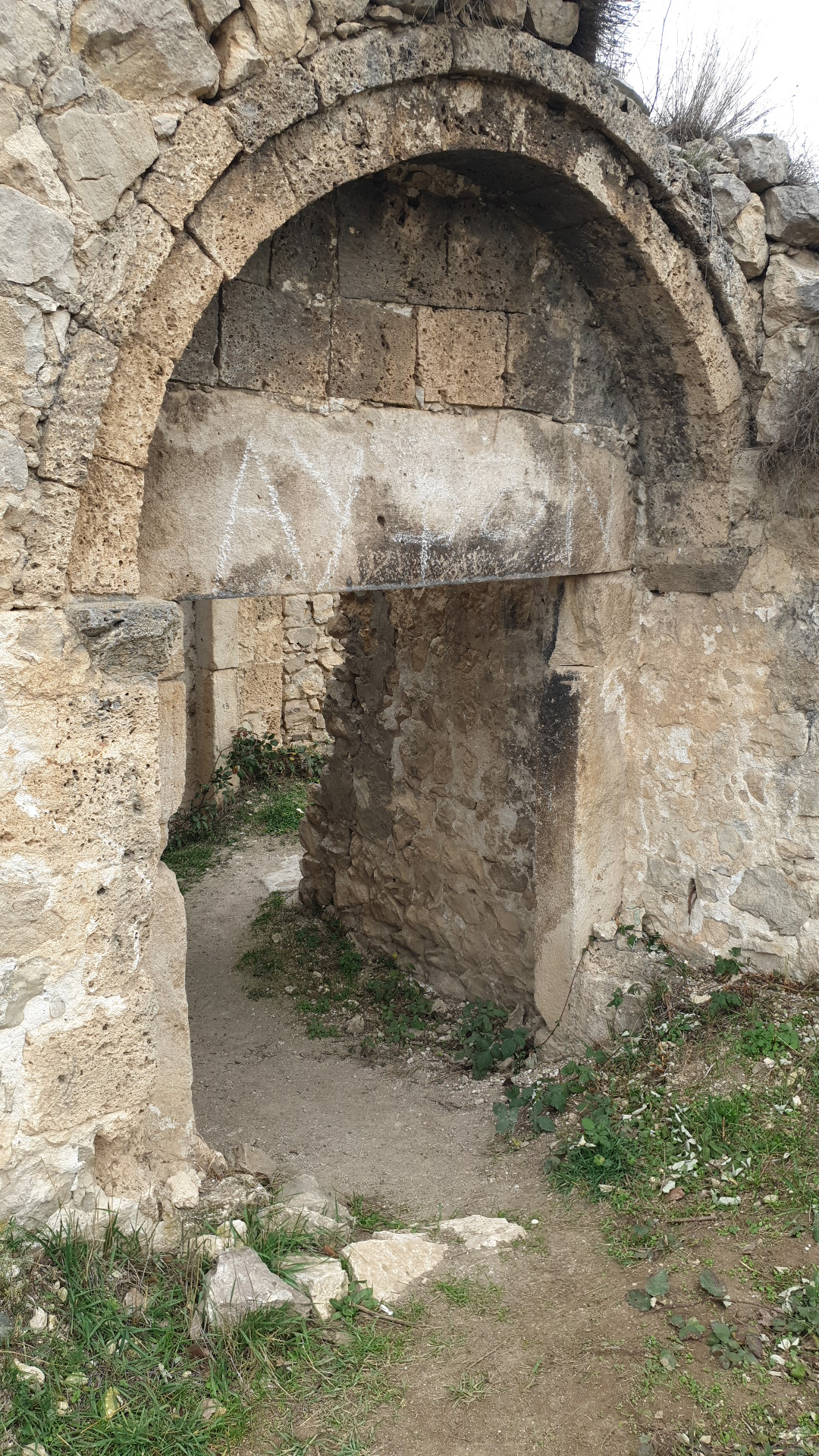

== See also ==
- Panah Ali Khan's Palace
- House of Khurshidbanu Natavan

== Literature ==
- Avalov, Elturan (1977). Архитектура города Шуши и проблемы сохранения его исторического облика [The Architecture of the City of Shusha and Challenges in Preserving Its Historical Character] (in Russian). Baku: Elm.
