= "Khan gizi" spring =

- Xan qızı bulağı (Azerbaijani)
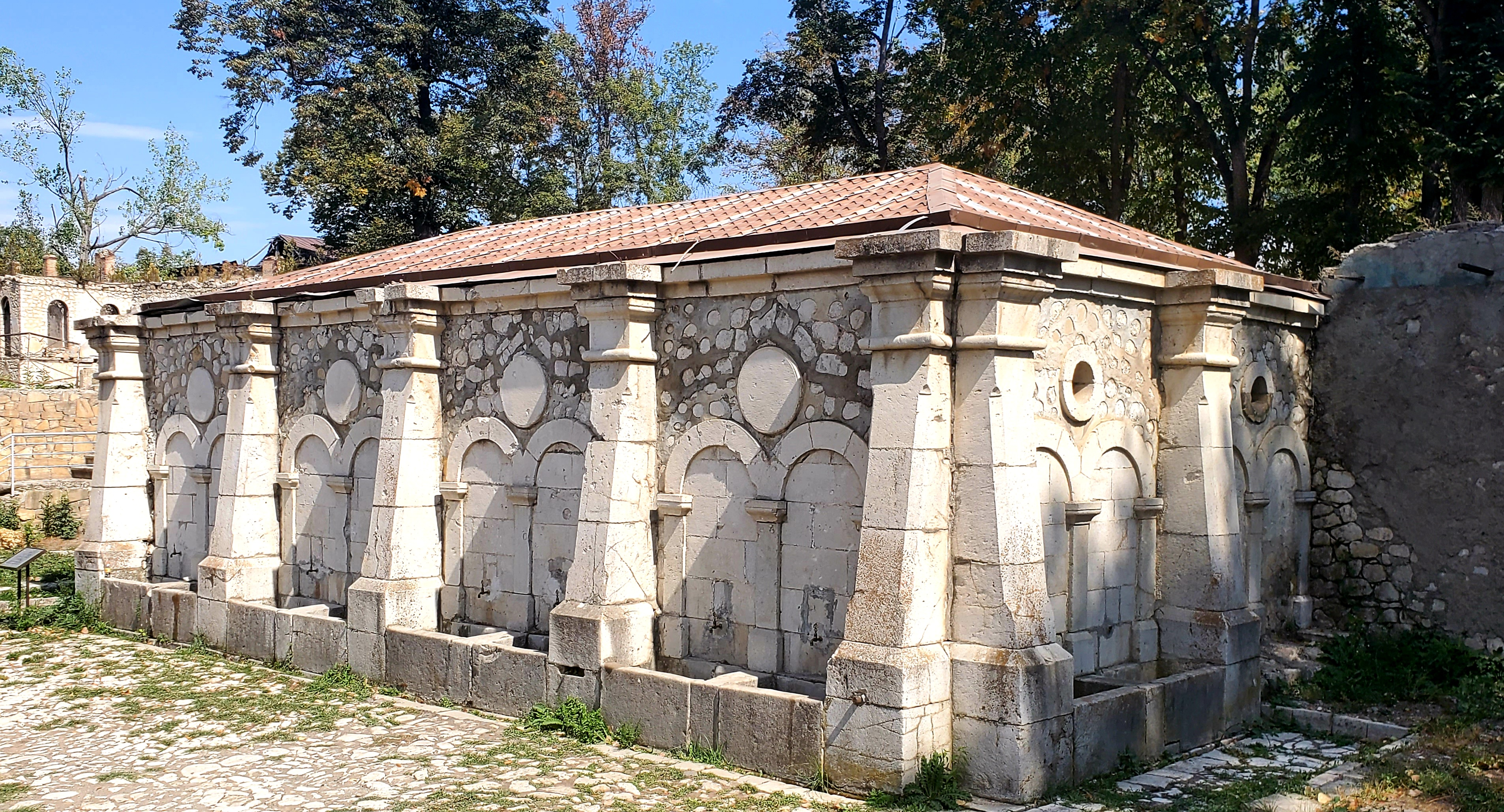
- Interactive map of "Khan gizi" spring
- 39°45′51″N 46°45′04″E
- Type: spring
- Location: Shusha, Azerbaijan

History
- Founded: 1871
- Founder: Khurshidbanu Natavan

"Khan gizi" spring (also known as Khan's Daughter's Spring) is a spring located next to Khan's daughter Natevan's palace in the Çöl Qala neighborhood of Shusha. The spring was built in the 19th century by the order of Khurshidbanu Natavan.

After the occupation of Shusha on May 8, 1992, the spring was neglected. As a result, the water of the spring has dried up, and it has fallen into neglect.

Spring was included in the list of immovable historical and cultural monuments of local importance by the decision No. 132 issued by the Cabinet of Ministers of the Republic of Azerbaijan on August 2, 2001.

In 2020, after the liberation of Shusha during the Second Karabakh War, the spring was repaired and returned to people's use.

== History ==
After the city of Shusha was built, its people tried to meet their drinking water needs through wells dug in the yard. However, most of these waters were not suitable for drinking because they were salty. There were only two drinking water wells in the city. This was not enough for a city with a population of 30,000. Therefore, people met their water needs from the mountains 3–4 km away from the city, from the springs on the banks of Dashalti and Khalfali rivers. They filled water wineskins from these springs and carried them to the city with horses and donkeys. Bringing water from far away caused its price to be high. Wealthy families spent 50 rubles a year on water. Poor people were often forced to use salty springs or rainwater. They directed the water flowing from the roof of the houses, collecting it in a cistern they built underground at the bottom of the yard. In order to meet the drinking water needs of the city, various water sources were built in the city. Due to their architectural styles and differences, these springs are currently among the historical monuments of the city.

The spring was named after Khurshidbanu Natavan (1832–1897) who was a lyric poet and daughter of Mehdiqulu Khan Javanshir, who was the last khan of Karabakh. She is known for laying the first water main in Shusha.

== Construction of the spring ==
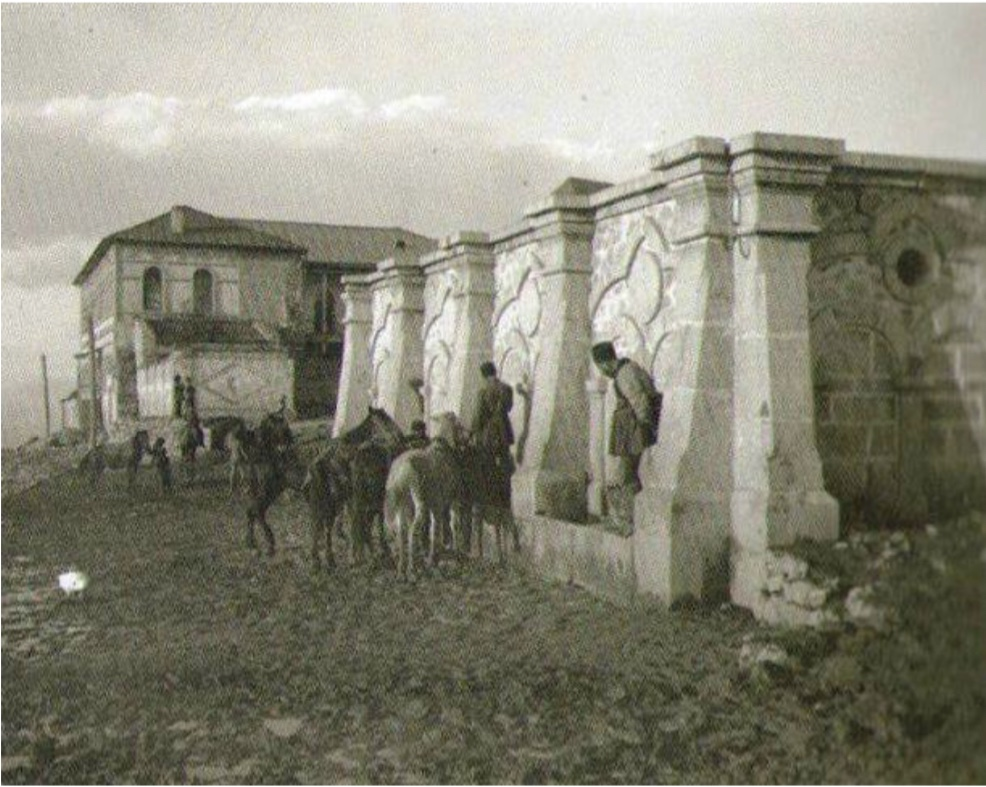
Khan gizi spring in XIX century

Khurshidbanu Natavan undertook the construction of one of the springs. In 1871, she built a water pipeline from the foot of Sarıbaba mountain to Shusha, seven kilometers away from the city, to provide the population with drinking water. The construction of the belt lasted for 1 year and 6 months and was successfully completed on August 18, 1873. Five thousand people gathered to participate in the opening ceremony of the spring. Khurshidbanu Natavan spent 100,000 manats of gold to build the spring. In addition to money, he donated 180 sheep and 20 sets of expensive robes to those who took part in drawing water. Poet and artist Mir Mohsun Navvab wrote a material-history on the drawing of water and appreciated the good work of Khurshidbanu Beyim.

The water was cool because the aqueduct was laid with earthen pipes. Later, ceramic pipes were replaced by bronze pipes. In order to present that water to the people, the Khan Gizi Spring was being built in the area of the palace complex of Khurshidbanu Natavan in the Cholgala quarter. The spring is made of white marble and consists of 12 eyes and 8 corner basins.

After the occupation of Shusha on May 8, 1992, the spring was neglected. As a result, the water of the spring dried up, and it became neglected.

The spring was included in the list of immovable historical and cultural monuments of local importance by decision No. 132 issued by the Cabinet of Ministers of the Republic of Azerbaijan on August 2, 2001.

In 2020, after the liberation of Shusha during the Second Karabakh War, the spring was repaired and returned to people's use.

== Gallery ==
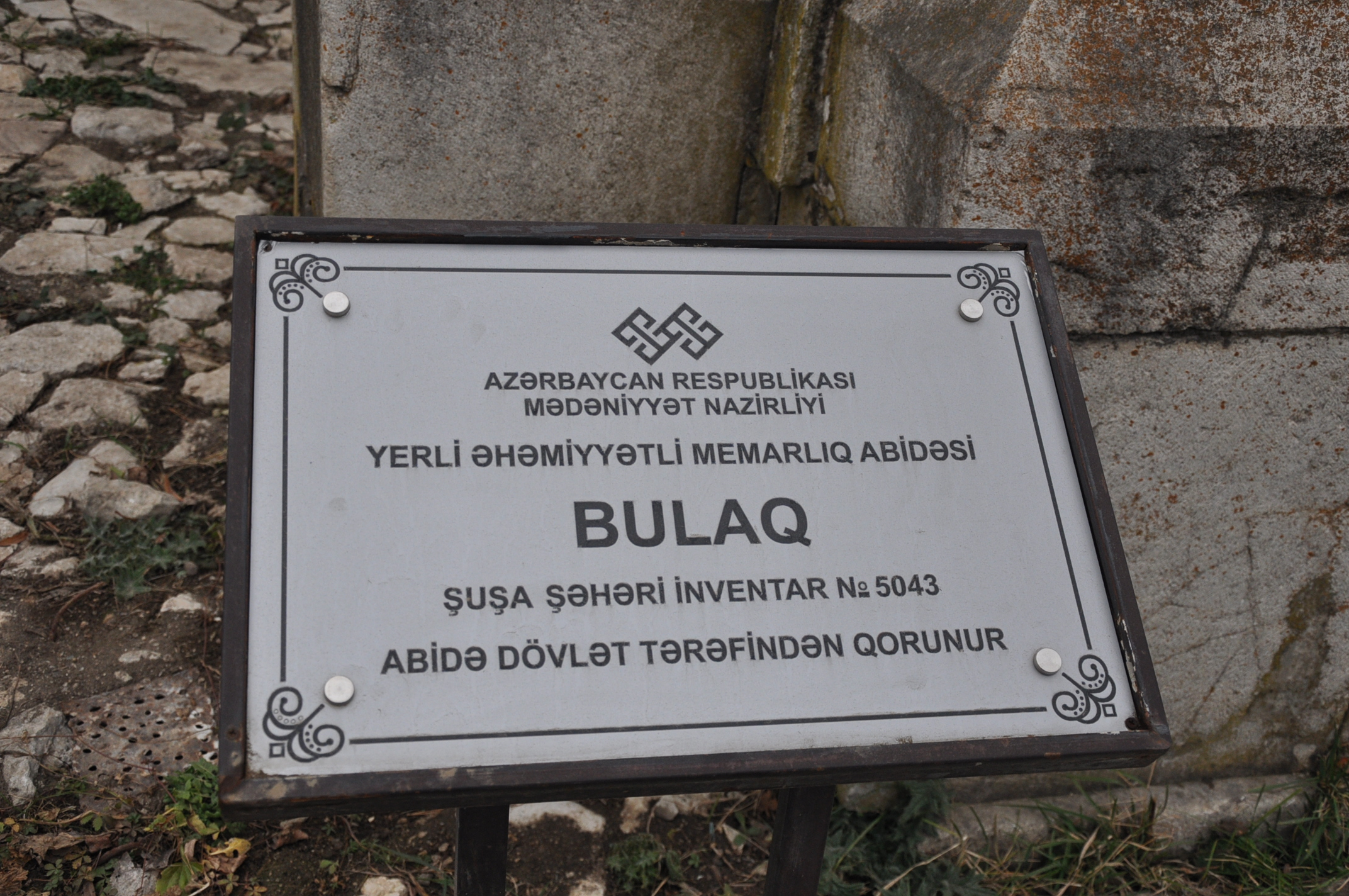

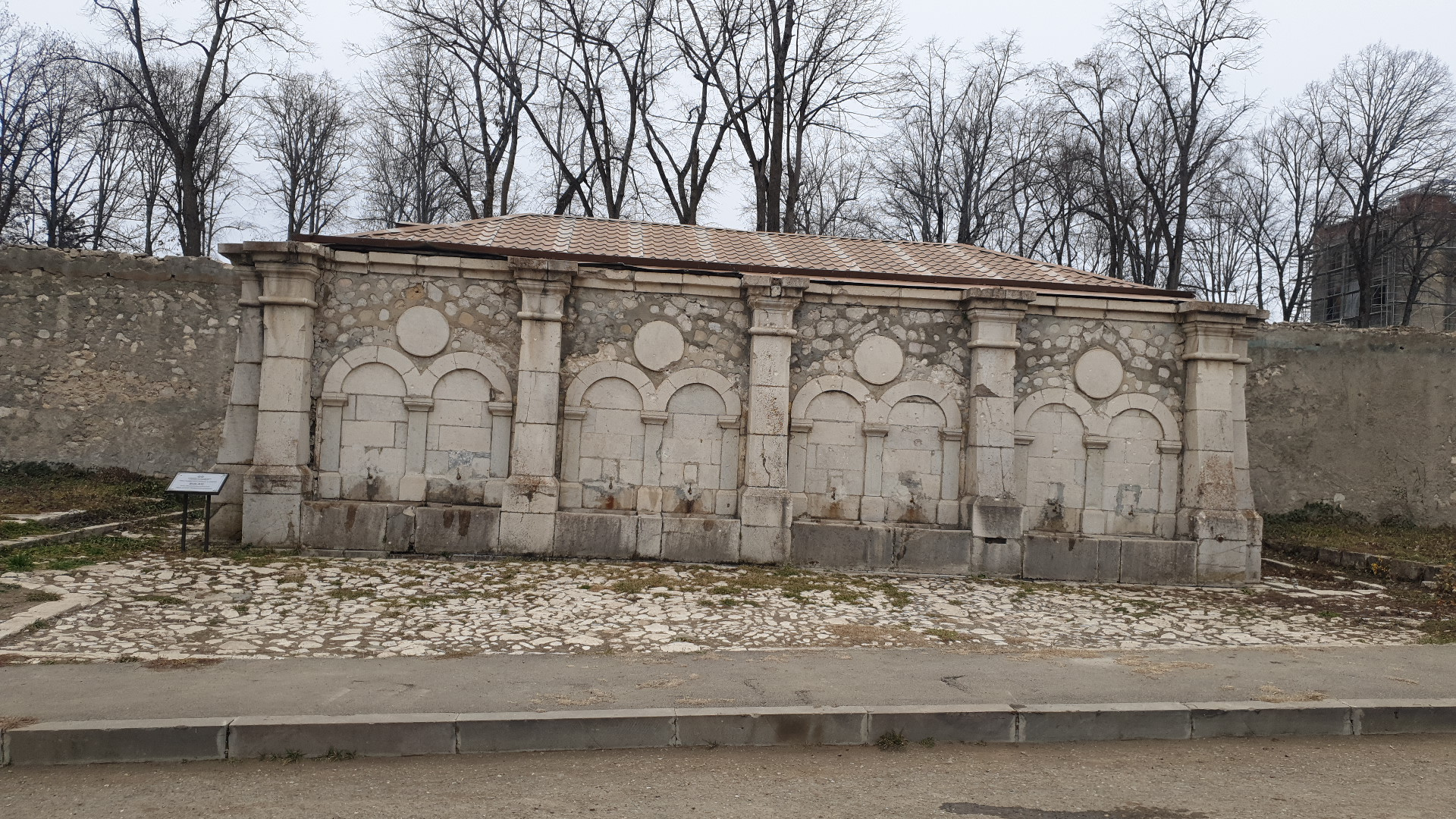

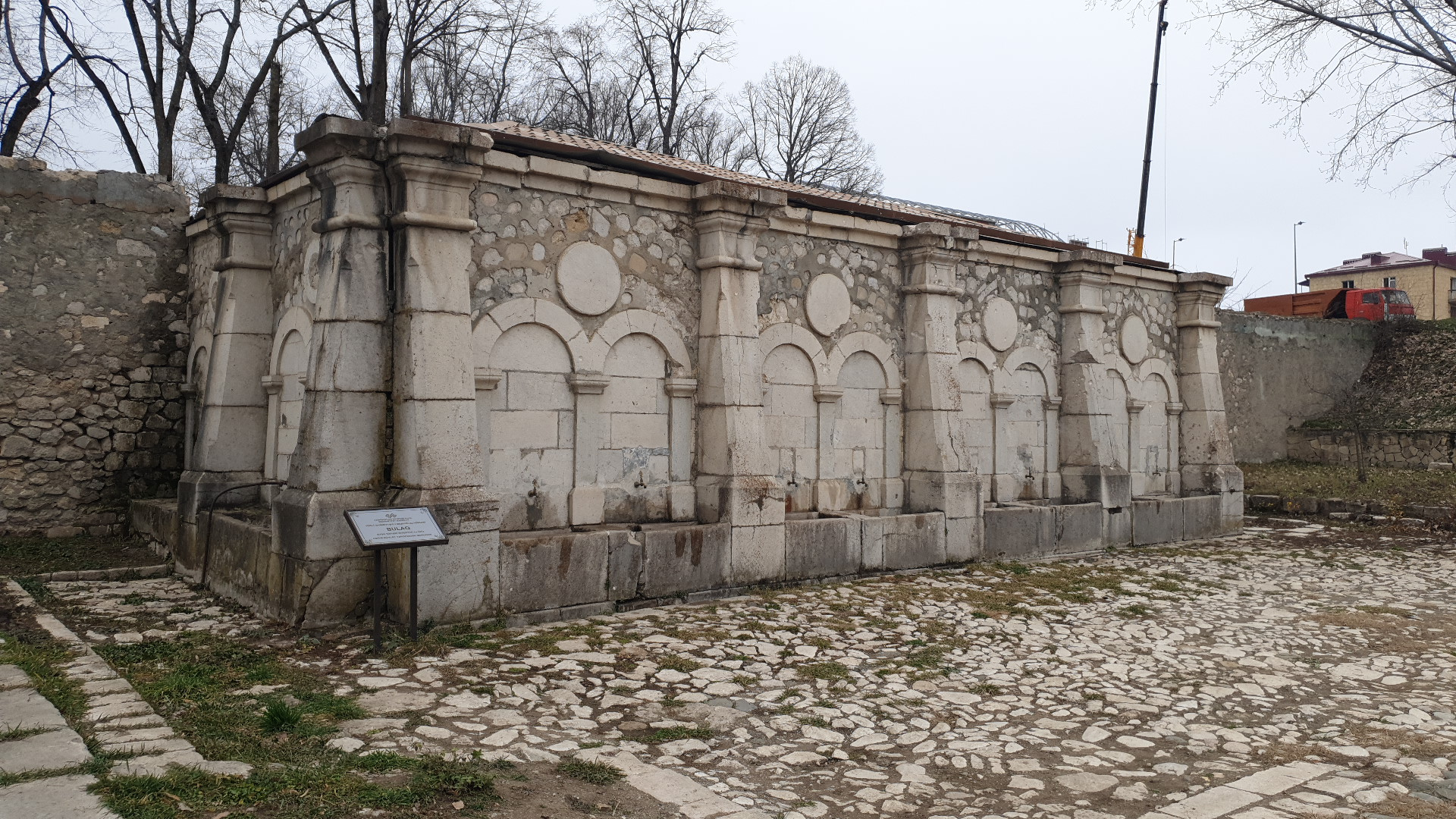

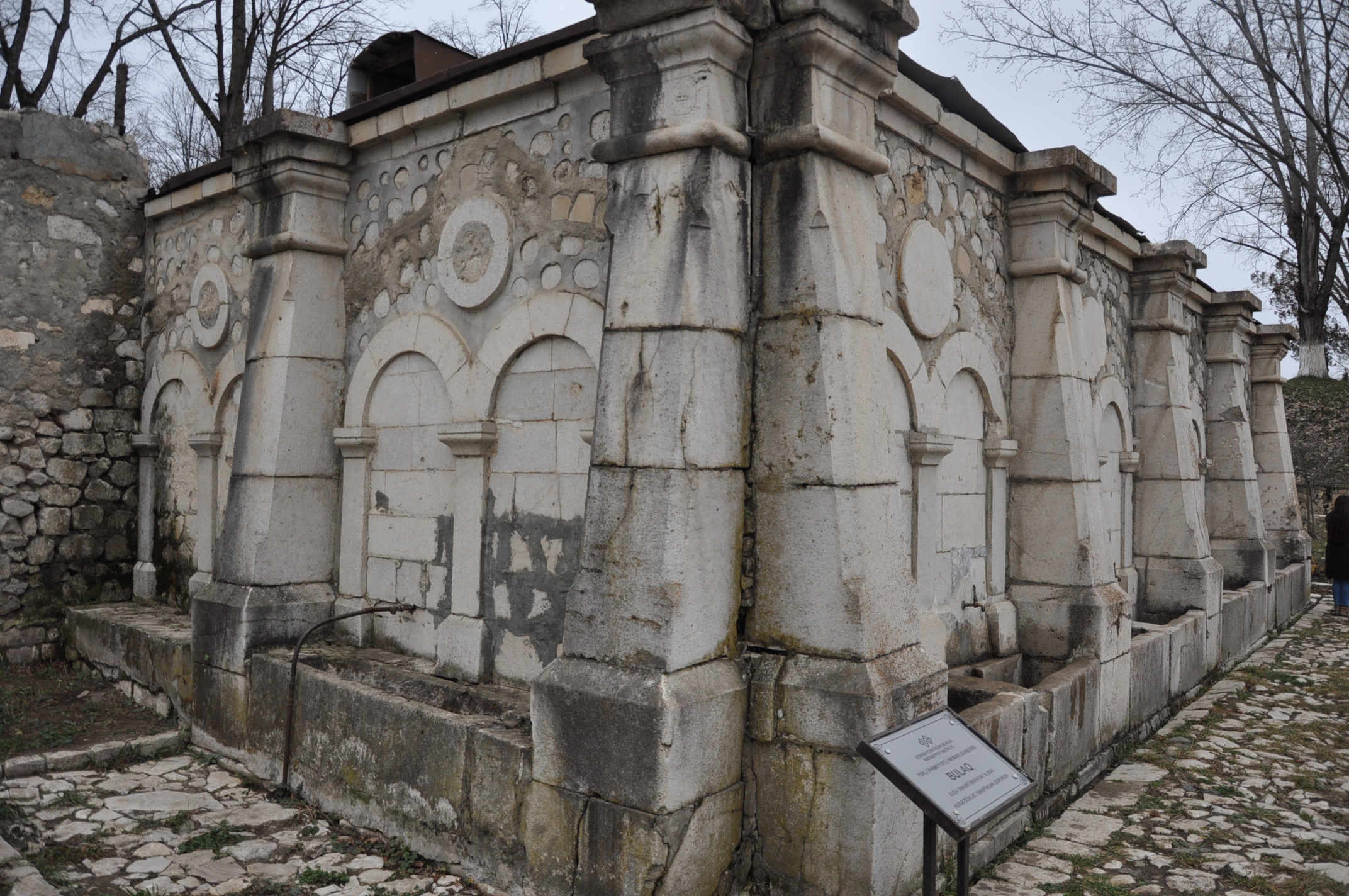

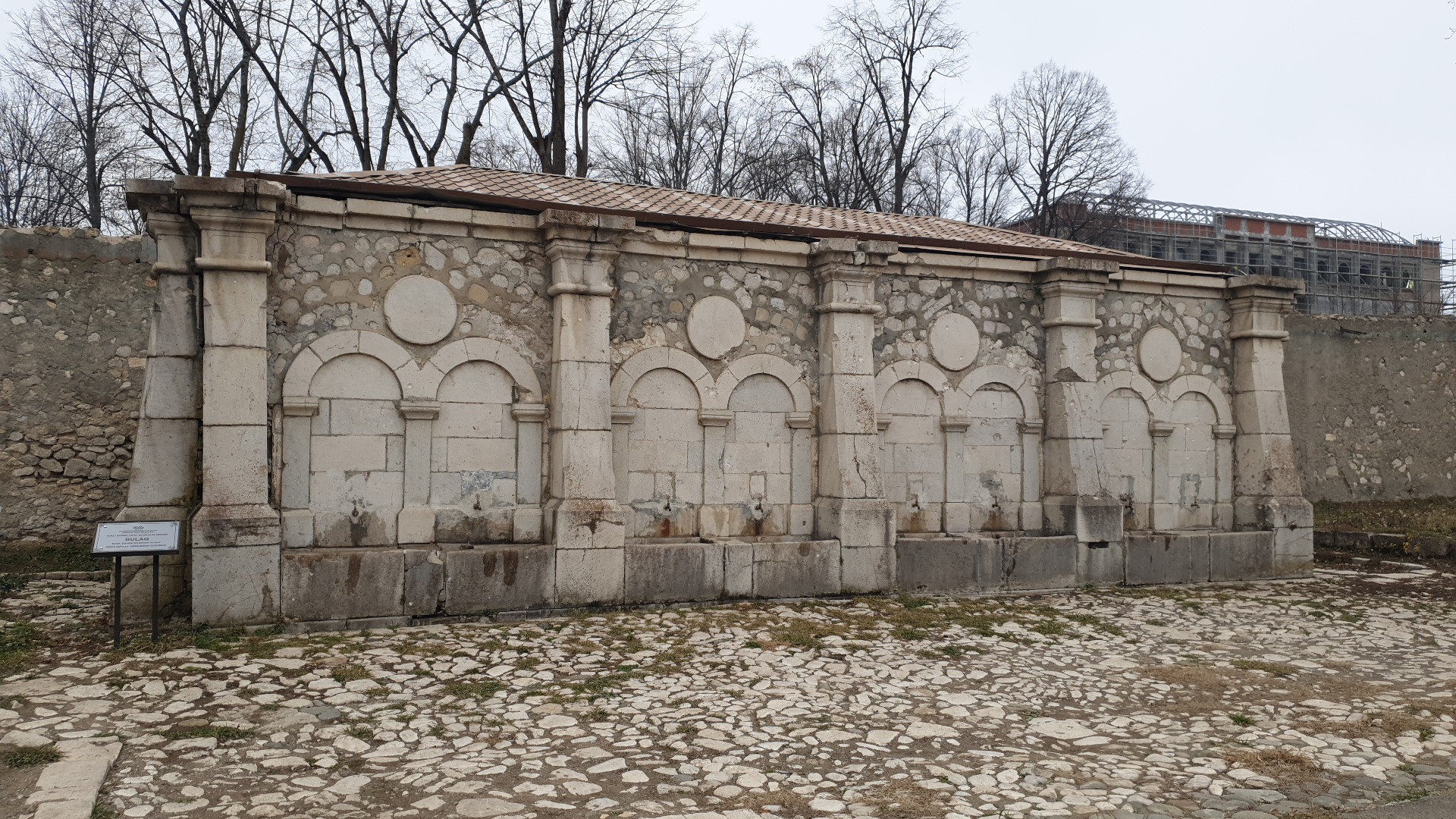

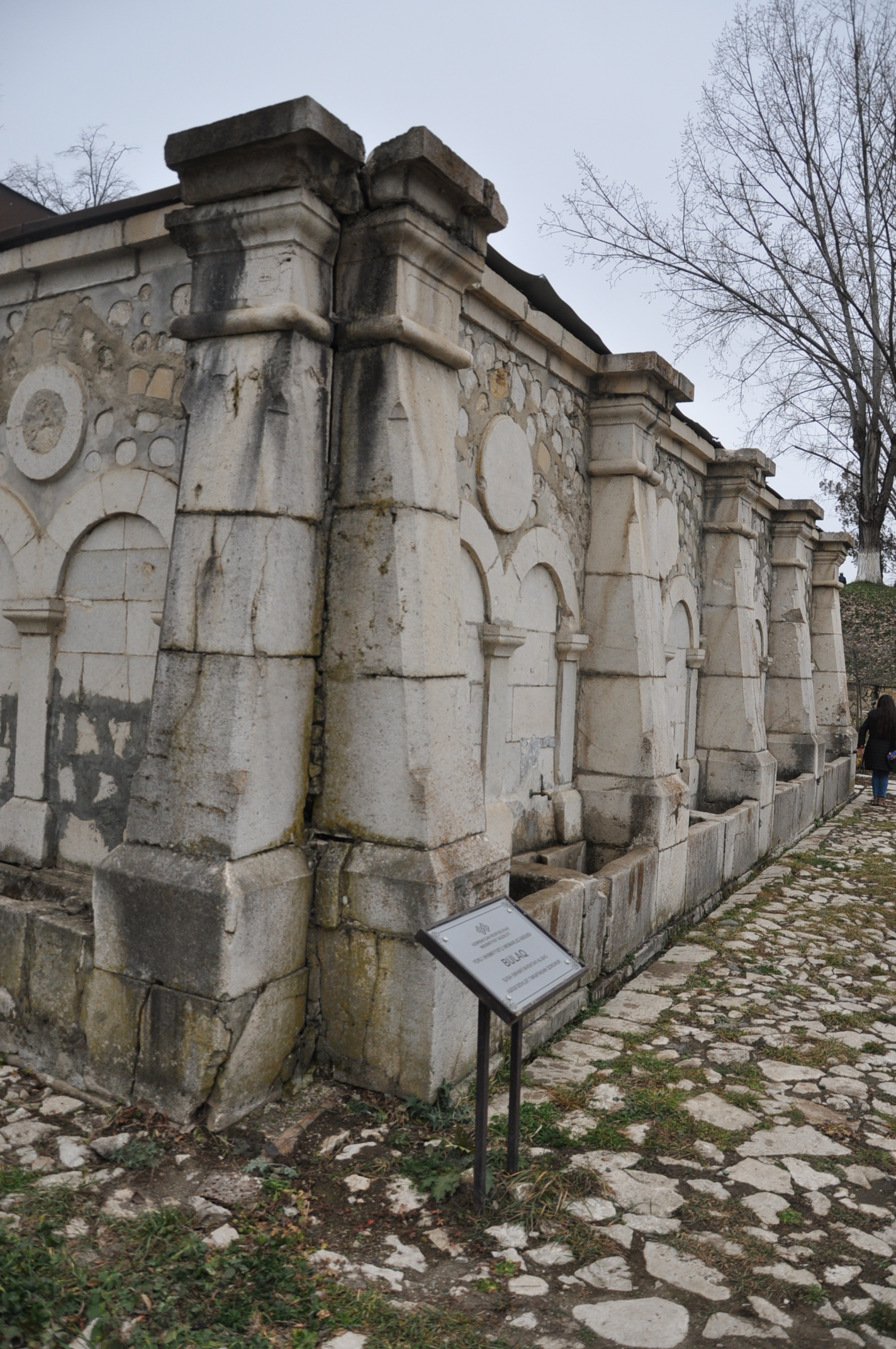

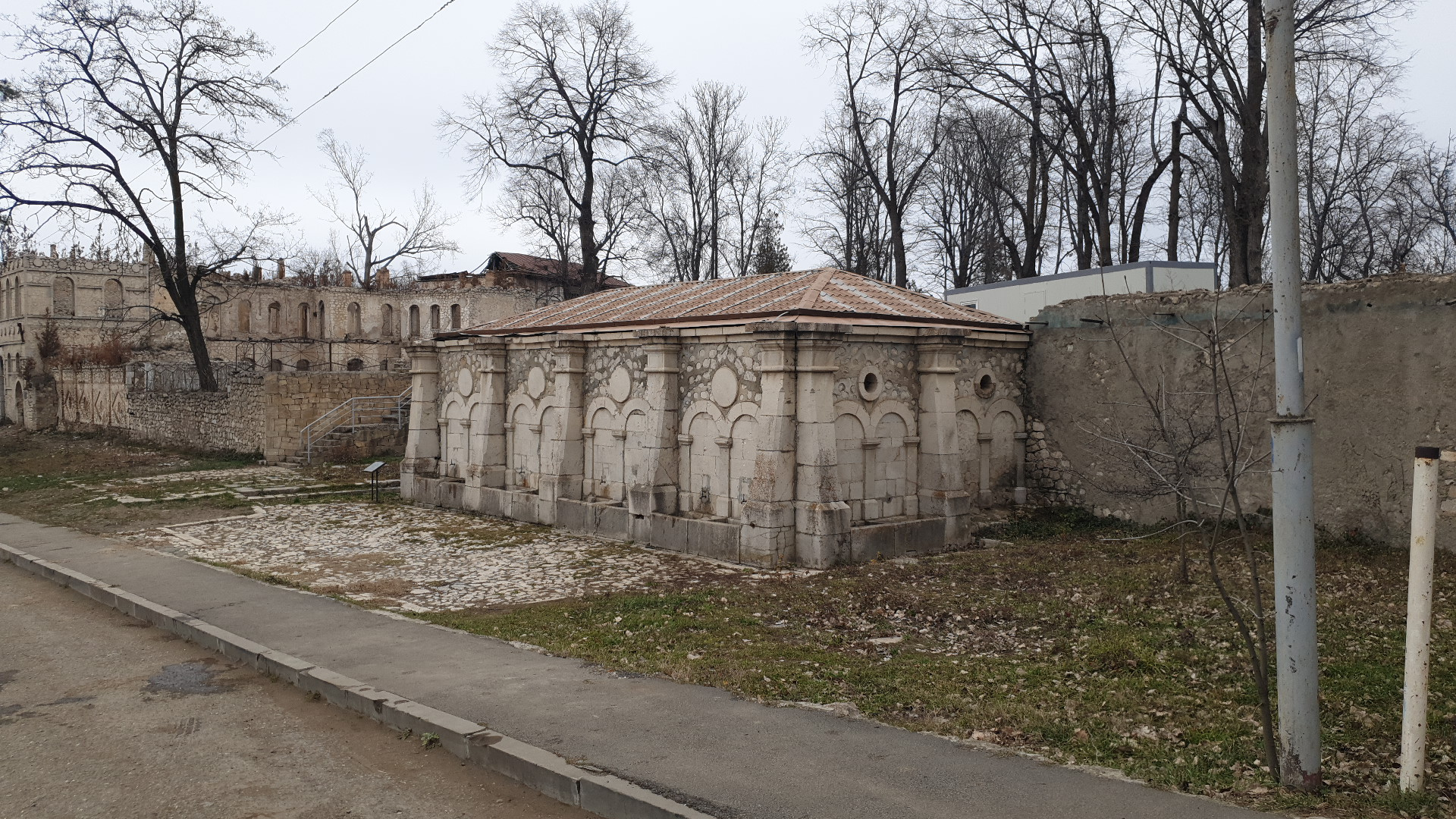

== See also ==
- House of Khurshidbanu Natavan
