= Gurdlar neighborhood (Shusha) =

Gurdlar neighborhood Azerbaijani: Qurdlar məhəlləsi Armenian: Գուրդլար թաղամաս
- Historic district
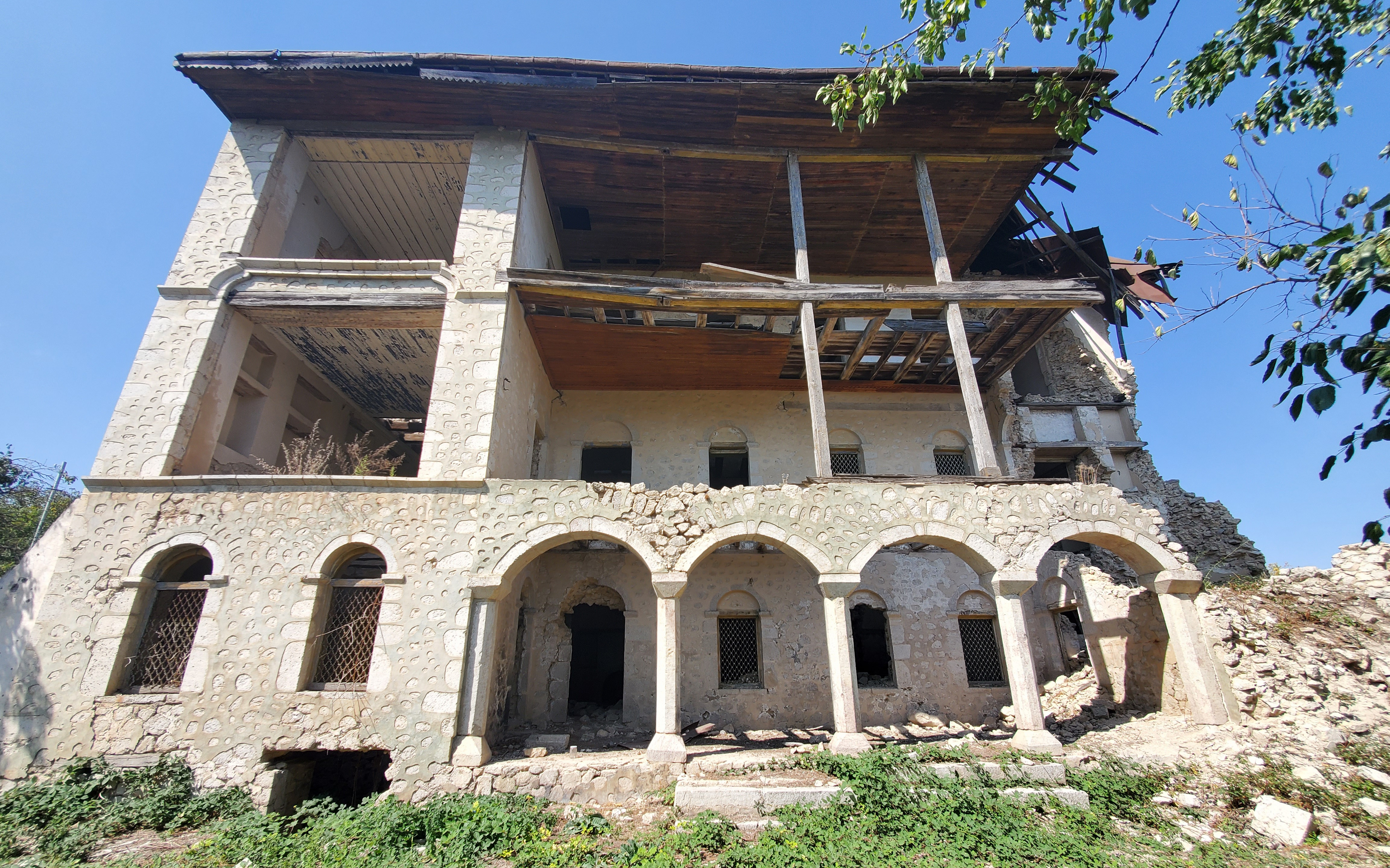
- Country: Azerbaijan
- City: Shusha
- Established: XVIII century

Gurdlar neighbourhood (Azerbaijani: Qurdlar məhəlləsi; Armenian: Գուրդլար թաղամաս) was founded in the 18th century, and is one of the lower quarters of the city of Shusha. There are located the house of Zohrabbeyov, the castle of Gara Boyuk Khanim, as well as the estate of the famous public figure, writer, and teacher Ahmad bey Aghaoglu's of father.

== Notable buildings in the neighbourhood ==
Here is located the Gara Boyuk Khanim castle. This is one of the two surviving castles on the territory of the Shusha Fortress. The inscription above the castle's opening of the entrance says that it was built in 1182 AH (1768).

Another estate on the territory of the quarter is Zohrabbeyov's house built in the 19th century. After soviet occupation, the edifice was confiscated and subsequently converted into an art gallery. After the occupation of Shusha by the Armenian forces in 1992, the building was looted, and the valuable decoration of the house, the stained-glass mirrors, and the wall paintings disappeared. Currently, it is in a dilapidated state.

In the Gurdlar neighbourhood, there was also located the house where Ahmed bey Aghaoglu was born and raised. After soviet occupation, this building was used as an institution and enterprise, as a boarding house and school. Among the local population it was known as the "Forest School". After the capture of Shusha by the Armenian armed forces in 1992, the house was completely destroyed. After the recapture of Shusha and the restoration of the control over the city by the Azerbaijani army, the General Centre of Turkic Homes (having its head office in Ankara) was established in the house of Ahmed bey Aghaoglu had appealed to the Azerbaijani state with a request to allow the restoration of the destroyed Aghaoglu house at its own expense.

== Photographs ==
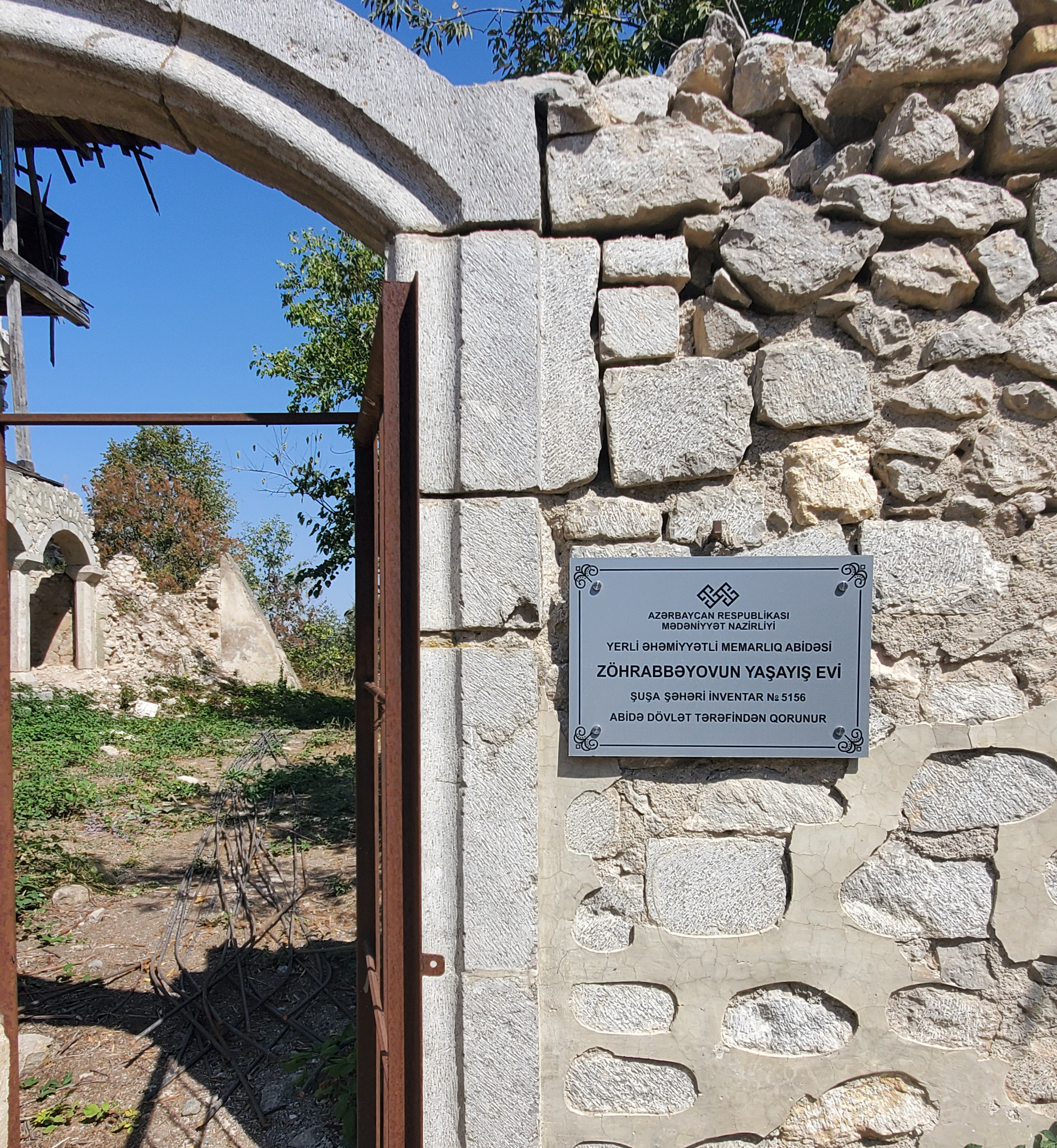

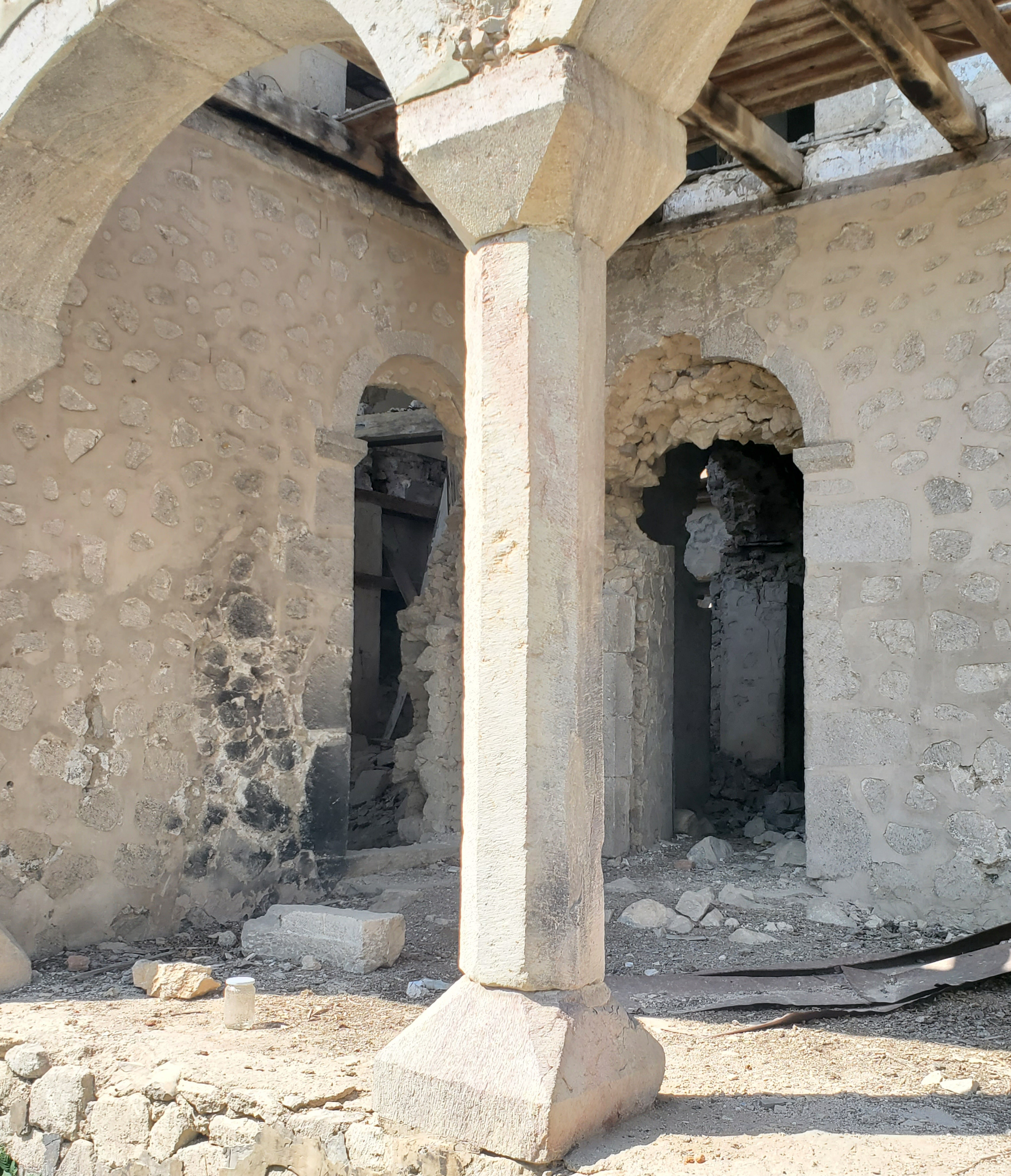

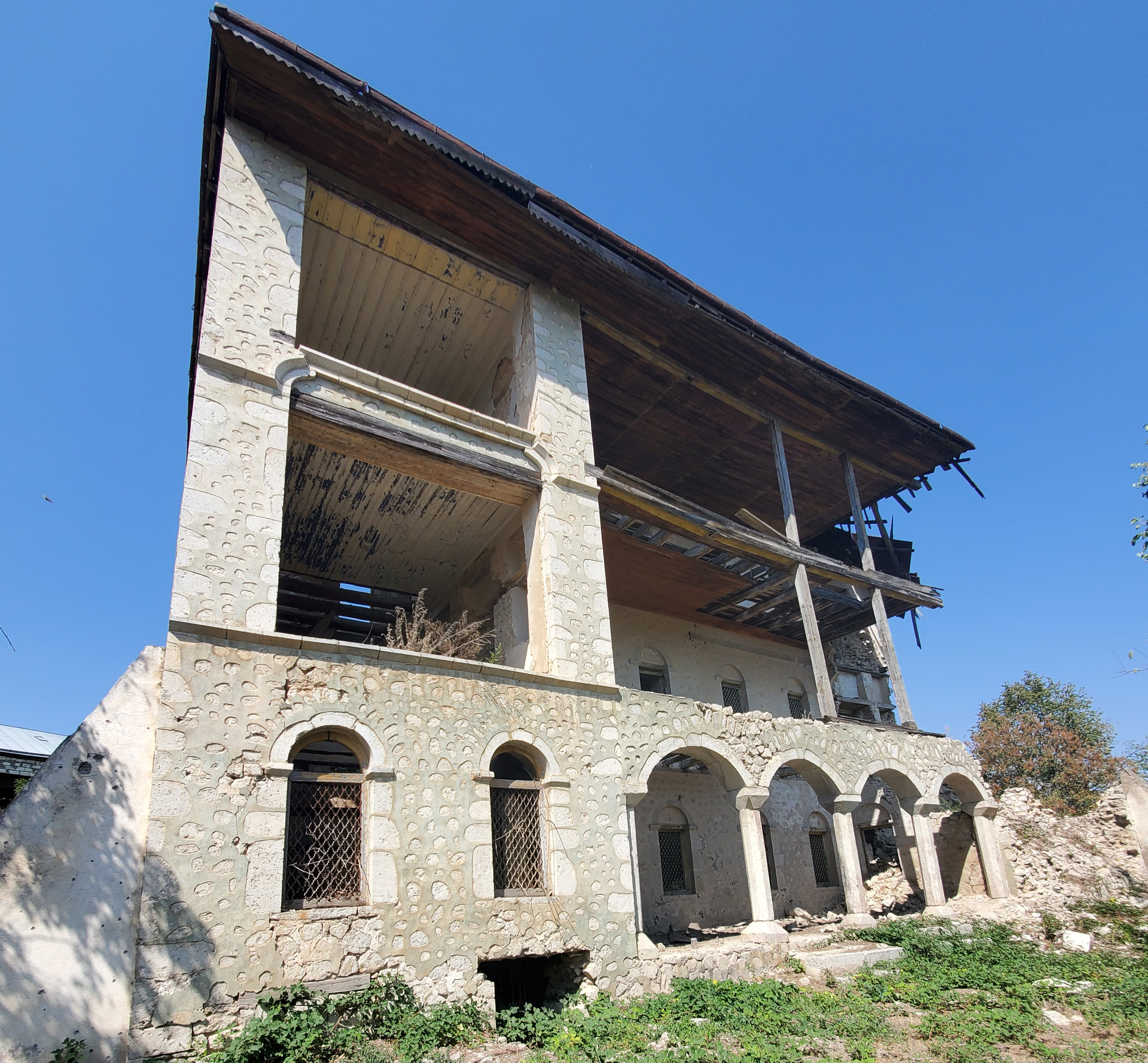

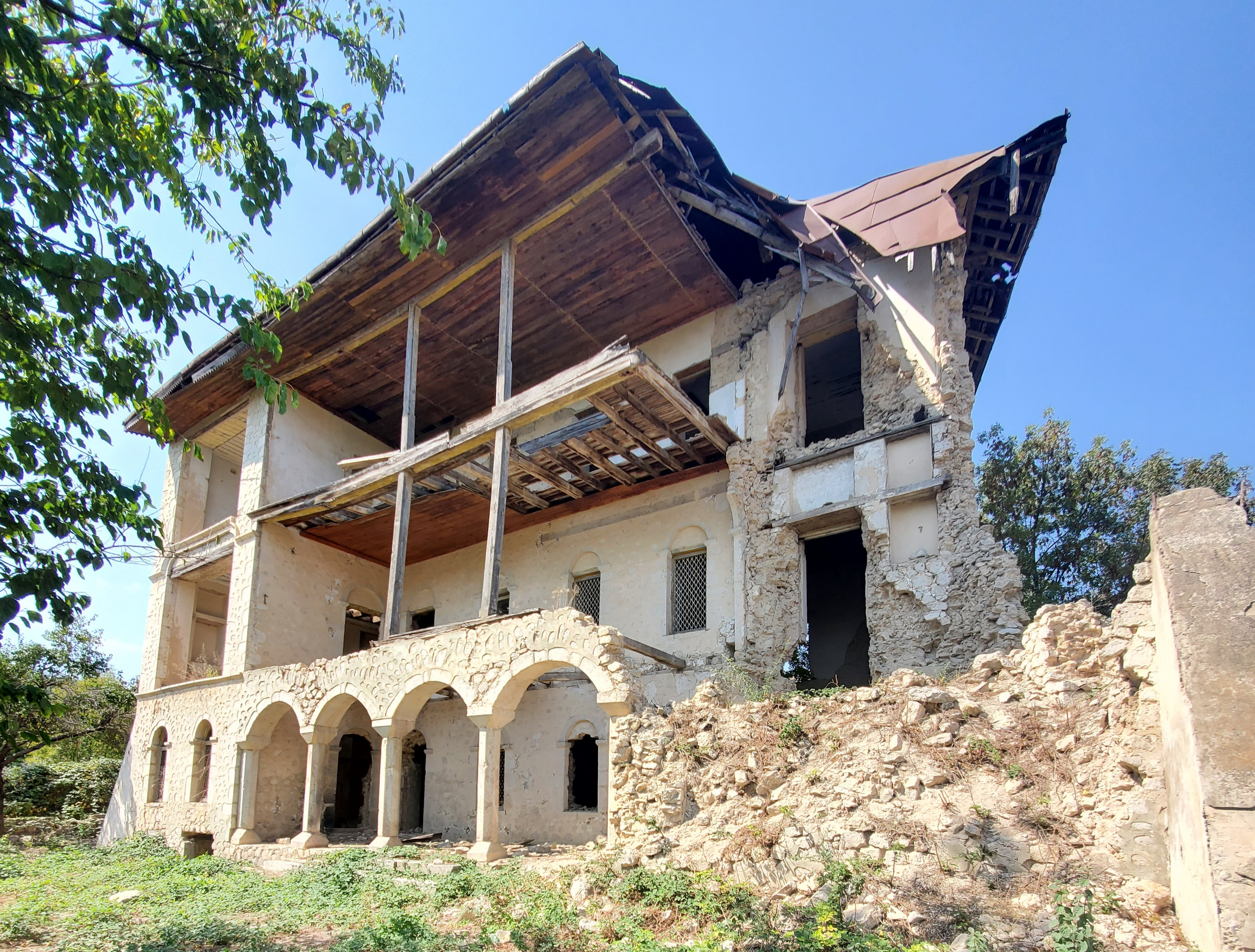

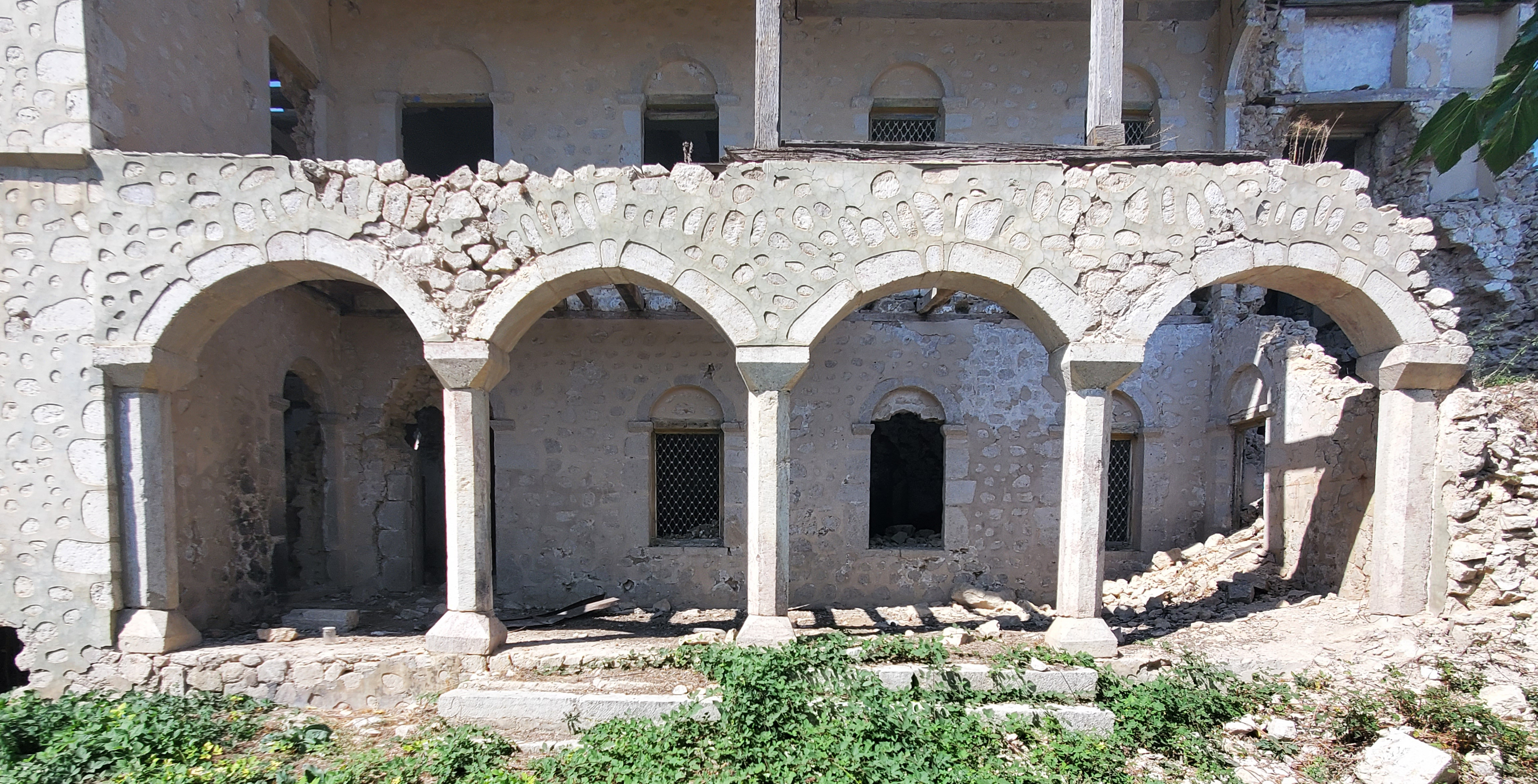
