= Gara Boyuk Khanim Castle =

Historic palace in Shusha, Azerbaijan

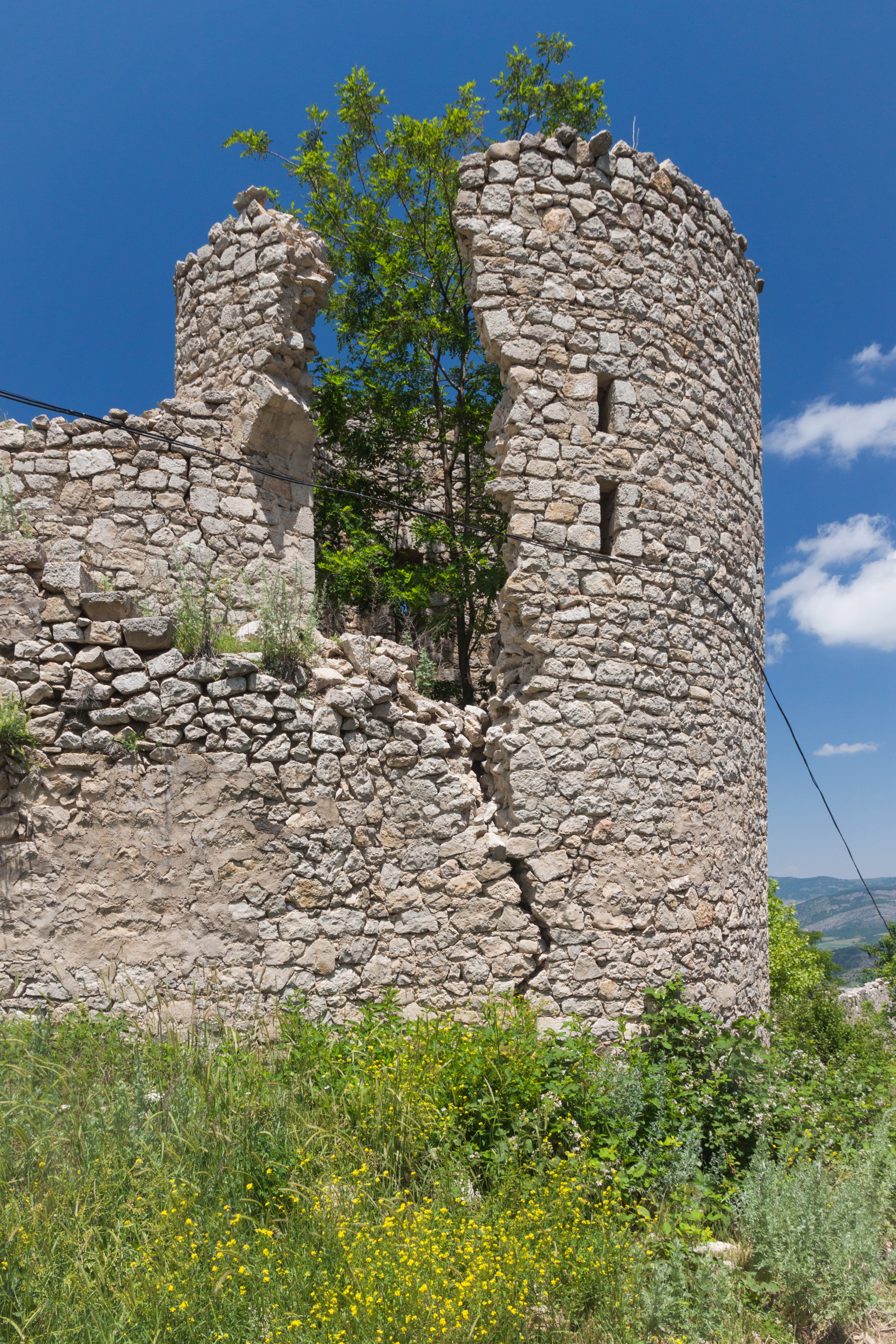
- The castle in 2014
- Interactive map of the Gara Boyuk Khanim Castle area
- Former names: Palace of Karaglukh

General information
- Type: Palace
- Location: Gurdlar neighborhood, Shusha, Azerbaijan
- Completed: 1724
- Renovated: 1768
- Client: Avan Yuzbashi
- Owner: Melikdom of Varanda (1724-1768); Karabakh Khanate (1768-1822)

Gara Boyuk Khanim Castle (Azerbaijani: Qara Böyük Xanım sarayı, Persian: قلعه قارا بویوک خانیم), or Palace of Karaghluk (Armenian: Քարագլուխի պալատ) is an 18th-century palace-castle located on a hill in the southeastern part of the town of Shusha (Shushi) in the Karabakh region of Azerbaijan. It is composed of four towers in a square plan. It is one of the two castles of Shusha that have survived to present day (the second is Panahali Khan's castle).

By the order of the Cabinet of Ministers of the Republic of Azerbaijan dated with 2 August 2001, the castle was taken under the state protection as an architectural monument of national importance (No. 339).

== History ==
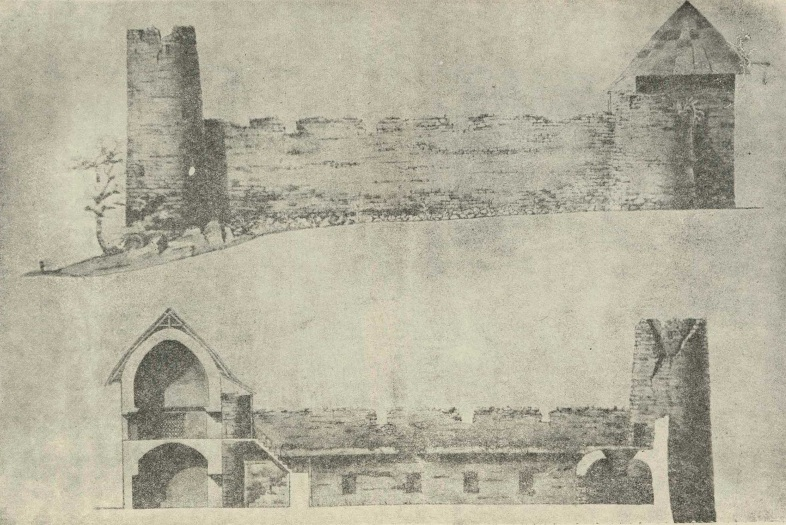
The scheme of one of the walls of the castle from the outer side (top) and a section of the same wall from the inner side (bottom)

The castle was originally built as an independent defensive structure before the construction of the Shusha fortress around the town. It corresponds to the newly-built Palace of Karaglukh, constructed by the Armenian commander of the sghnakh (military district) of Shushi, Avan Yuzbashi, in 1724. This construction is mentioned in the records of Shushi natives such as the historian Leo and the bishop and ethnographer Makar Barkhudaryan. Additionally, the location of the castle was known as the Amarat of Avan in reference to its owner. After the death of the Sparapet Avan in 1735, the castle passed into the hands of the Melik-Shahnazarian family, the traditional rulers (Meliks) of the Armenian principality of Varanda. By the 1770s, the castle was taken over by the Khans of Karabakh who rebuilt it by adding new architectural elements, rooms, and a roof to the original structure. This rebuilding was also accompanied by a Persian language inscription on the main gate entrance dating the castle to 1182 Hijra (1768 AD). However given its history as a palace belonging to the Meliks of Varanda, it was known as a Melikian house up until the 19th century. The structure was not listed by the Karabakh historian Mirza Jamal Javanshir in his work Tarikh-e Qarabagh (History of Karabakh) as one of the buildings and structures newly constructed by the Karabakh Khans.

For the overwhelming majority of the feudal cities, there was characteristic the presence of fortified citadels built within the city on naturally protected hills. These citadels, which were the architectural and planning dominant of the newly created cities, housed the palace complex, fortifications and other structures designed to serve the ruler and ensure his safety.

Only two castles located in the southeastern part of Shusha have survived to nowadays. One of them is the castle of Gara Boyuk Khanim, standing on a hill, the second is the castle of Panahali Khan, which stands at the edge of a cliff over a deep ravine.

== Architectural features ==
The architectural originality of the castles in the Shusha fortress attracted the attention of the travelers and guests of the city. For example, in the middle of the 19th century, the newspaper Kavkaz noted:

Among the various houses and residential buildings of the city, the castles where the khan's family members live, immediately catch the eye: they are unique. They are surrounded by high walls with round towers at the corners.

Focusing on the undated master plan, we can conclude that almost all Shusha castles had the same configuration being rectangular in plan, and surrounded, on all four sides, by defensive walls with three-quarter towers at the corners. From the inside, the premises were attached to these walls serving as housing for the inhabitants of the castles. The volumetric-spatial and planning solution of the Shusha castles was created under the influence of the Shahbulag castle architecture.

The main entrances of the castles were facing north, similarly to the Shahbulag castle, being protected from a direct access by prismatic gate towers with L-shaped passages extended outward.

The one-story residential and utility rooms included in the palace complex were located along the inner perimeter of the building. On their roofs, at a height of 1.5 meters, loopholes were placed in the walls of the castle. Thus, the roofs of the residential buildings were used as defensive platforms.

Although the main entrance of the castle, facing north, was designed in the same way as the entrance to the palace of Ibrahimkhalil Khan, here the prismatic volume protruding forward was two-story. On the second floor of the palace lived its owner together with the family members. The walls of the rooms and the arched ceilings were decorated with paintings.

The towers of the fortress walls surrounding the palace complex were two-tiered and narrowed as their height increased. The towers had a domed roof.

Both the ceiling and the walls of the palace building were carefully and neatly built from well-hewn small stones.

== Literature ==
- Avalov, Elturan (1977). Архитектура города Шуши и проблемы сохранения его исторического облика. Baku: Elm.
- Ghulyan, Artak (2001). "Shushi". Castles (Palaces) of Meliks of Artsakh and Siunik (PDF). Research on Armenian Architecture. Vol. 4. Yerevan: "Gitutiun" Publishing House of NAS RA. pp. 96–105. ISBN 5-8080-0469-1.
- Salamzadeh, Abdulvahab (1964). Архитектура Азербайджана XVI-XIX вв. Baku: Академия наук Азербайджанской ССР.
- Sarkisov, A.; Alizade, A. (1950). О некоторых архитектурных памятниках Шуши (Памятники архитектуры Азербайджана (сборник материалов). Vol. II. Moscow-Baku.
