= House of Khurshidbanu Natavan =

- Azerbaijani: Xurşidbanu Natəvanın evi
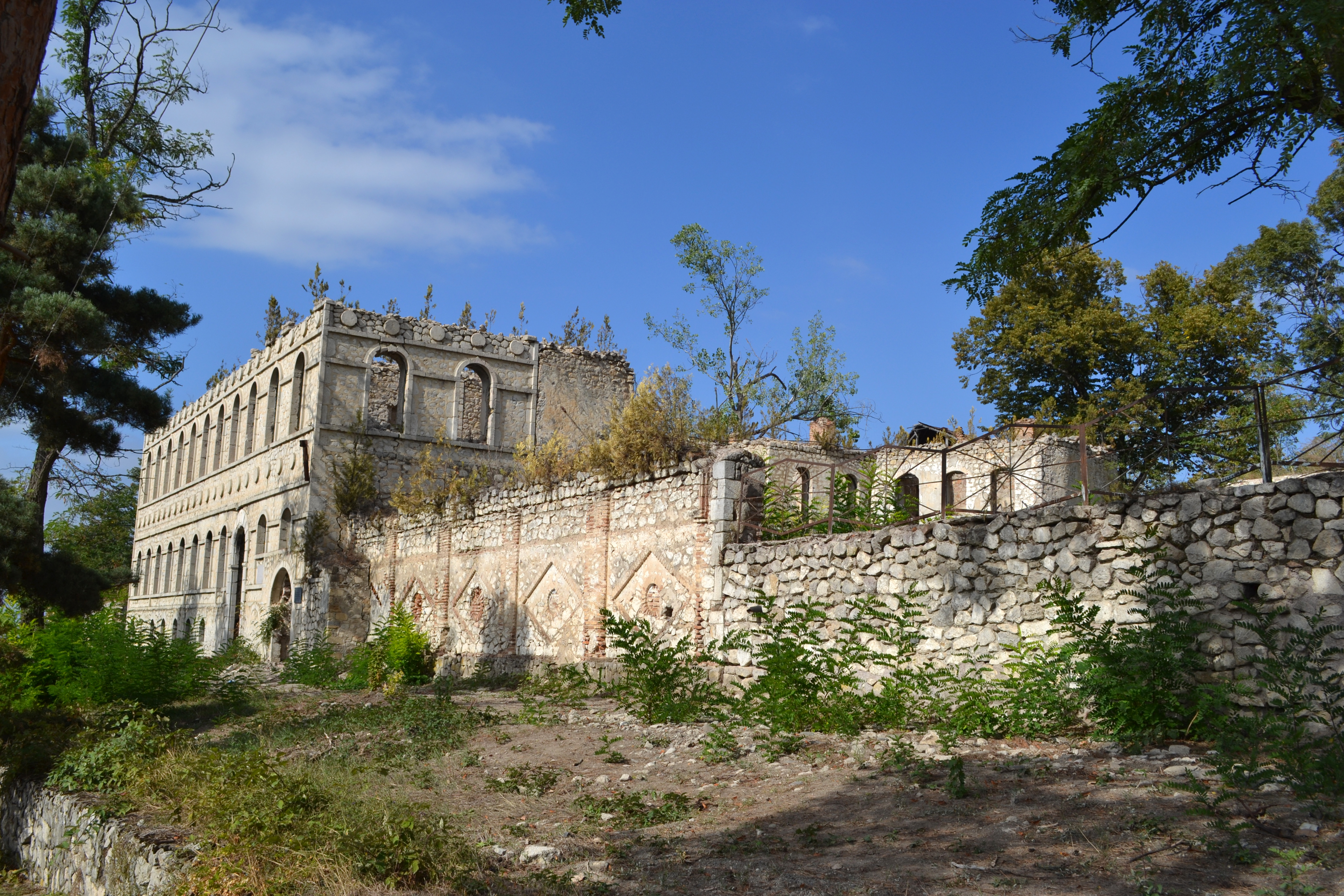
- The house in 2021

- Location within Azerbaijan
- Established: 18th–19th centuries
- Location: Shusha, Azerbaijan
- Coordinates: 39°45′53.7″N 46°45′3.07″E
- Type: House-museum
- Architect: Karbalayi Safikhan Karabakhi
- Owner: Government of Azerbaijan

The House of Khurshidbanu Natavan (Azerbaijani: Xurşidbanu Natəvanın evi), also known as the Palace of Natavan, Daughter of the Khan (Azerbaijani: Xan qızı Natəvanın sarayı), is an 18th or 19th-century historical and architectural monument, and a museum in Shusha, Azerbaijan.

The three-storey house, being one of the first residential houses in Shusha, belonged to the 19th-century Azerbaijani speaking poet Khurshidbanu Natavan. During Soviet rule, it served as a music and art school, and later, as a house-museum dedicated to Natavan. The building was heavily damaged when the Armenian forces captured Shusha in 1992, during the First Nagorno-Karabakh War, while the Azerbaijani authorities accused the Armenian forces of looting the building.

The building has an architecture atypical for the other residential buildings in Shusha. Constructed with stone, and in a smaller scale, brick, it is filled with frescoes and alabaster carvings. The house also has a large garden, which houses various smaller buildings intended for home service.

== History ==
The House of Khurshidbanu Natavan is one of the first residential houses in Shusha, built by the Azerbaijani architect Karbalayi Safikhan Karabakhi in the 18th or 19th century for Khurshidbanu Natavan, an Azerbaijani poet.

On Bulbul's initiative, the People's Commissariat of Education of the Azerbaijani SSR established the Shusha Music School on 10 October 1932. The school operated in the building, and in 1984, it got renamed the Niyazi Children's Art School. In 1987, the Soviet government restored the building and created the house-museum of Khurshidbanu Natavan, a branch of the National museum of Azerbaijan literature named after Nizami Ganjavi, with its first director being Namig Babayev.

On 8 May 1992, during the First Nagorno-Karabakh War, the Armenian forces captured Shusha, and its Azerbaijani population of about 15,000 people, was forced to flee. Most of the city came into ruins, including the building, and Shusha turned into a ghost town. According to the Azerbaijani officials, the Armenian forces destroyed and looted hundreds of paintings, carpets, miniatures, souvenirs and archaeological samples collected in the museum.

Azerbaijan recaptured Shusha after a three-day long battle on 7 November 2020, during the Second Nagorno-Karabakh War.

== Architecture ==
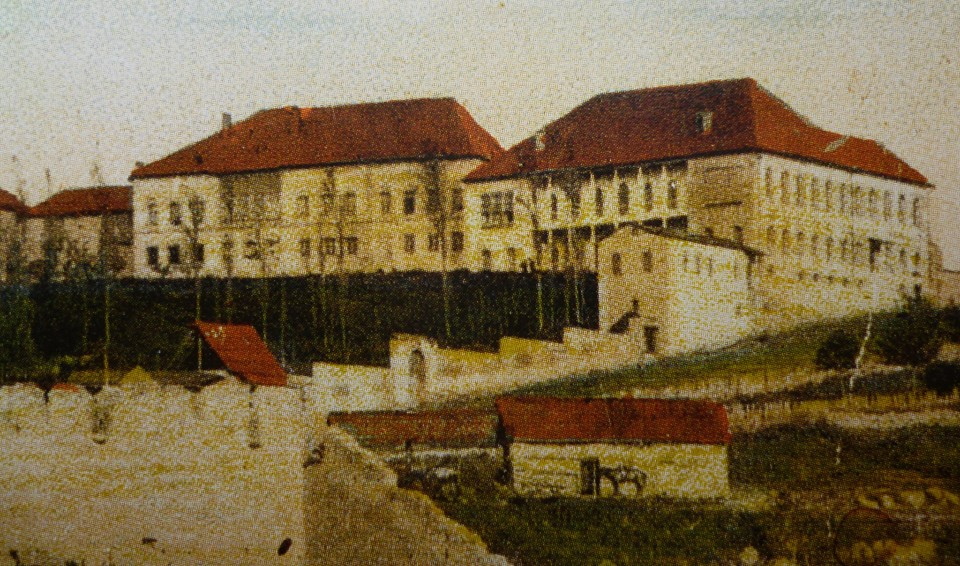
House of Natavan, historical photograph

The house's southern wall is made of brick, and the rest are made of stone. The building has a rectangular shape with dimensions of 24x12,5 meters. The height of the building from the ground to the roof is 8.5 meters. There are seven rooms dedicated to home service and the servants on the first floor of the building. There are three entry gates on the building's southern side. The middle-gate leads to a hallway, while the other two lead to the side rooms. There are two groups of rooms on the ground floor, one of them includes four rooms and the other three rooms. There is a hallway connecting these groups of rooms.

The access to the second floor is achieved by a stone staircase built into the house's western wall. There is a spacious living room in the centre of the second floor, and there are four living rooms around it. The hall is illuminated on both sides by large mesh windows measuring 5x3,5 meters along its entire length. There are two more windows around the large door situated in the floor's southern wall. The height of the hall is about 5 meters. The other four rooms' height, under which the balconies are located, is slightly lower. Frescoes and alabaster carvings were used to decorate the interior of the hallway.

The House of Khurshidbanu Natavan has an architecture atypical for the other residential buildings in Shusha. The southern facade of the building is divided by vertically placed ridges. There are wider ridges on the frames of the windows located in the building's second floor. The house is resistant to aridity due to the different distances between the divisions. Thanks to the added horizontal divisions at the top, the facade has a smooth and light character.

The brick wall of the building's first and second floors was built with arches and rectangular windows. Its third floor also has a brick wall. The building's facade's such division created a light-shadow effect. The building's facade, constructed with stones and facing north, is more similar to Shusha's architecture. Despite this, it lags behind many nobility houses in terms of the quality of the architectural work.

The house also has a large garden, which houses various smaller buildings intended for home service.

== Gallery ==
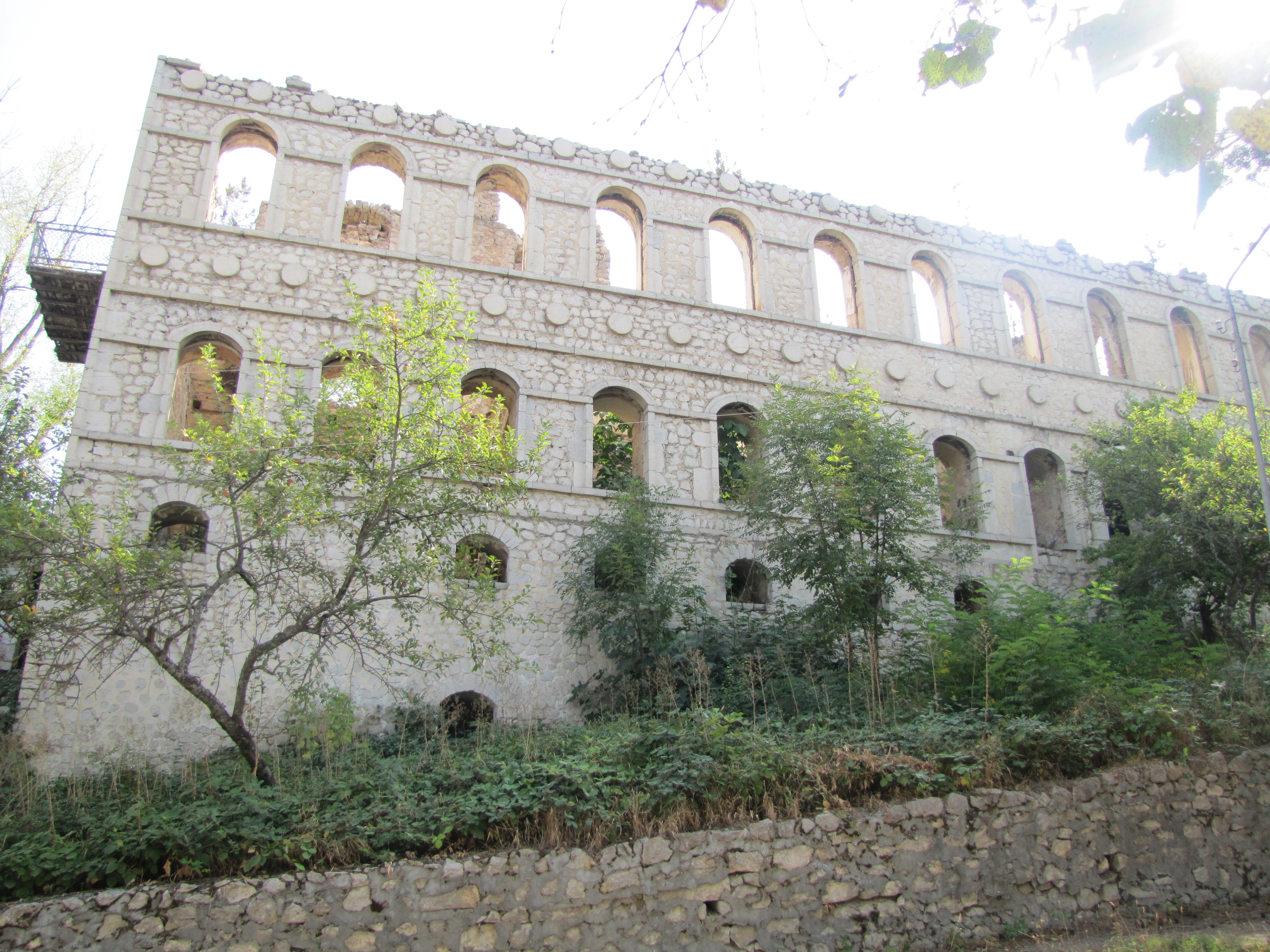
Ruined state of the house after the Armenian capture of Shusha

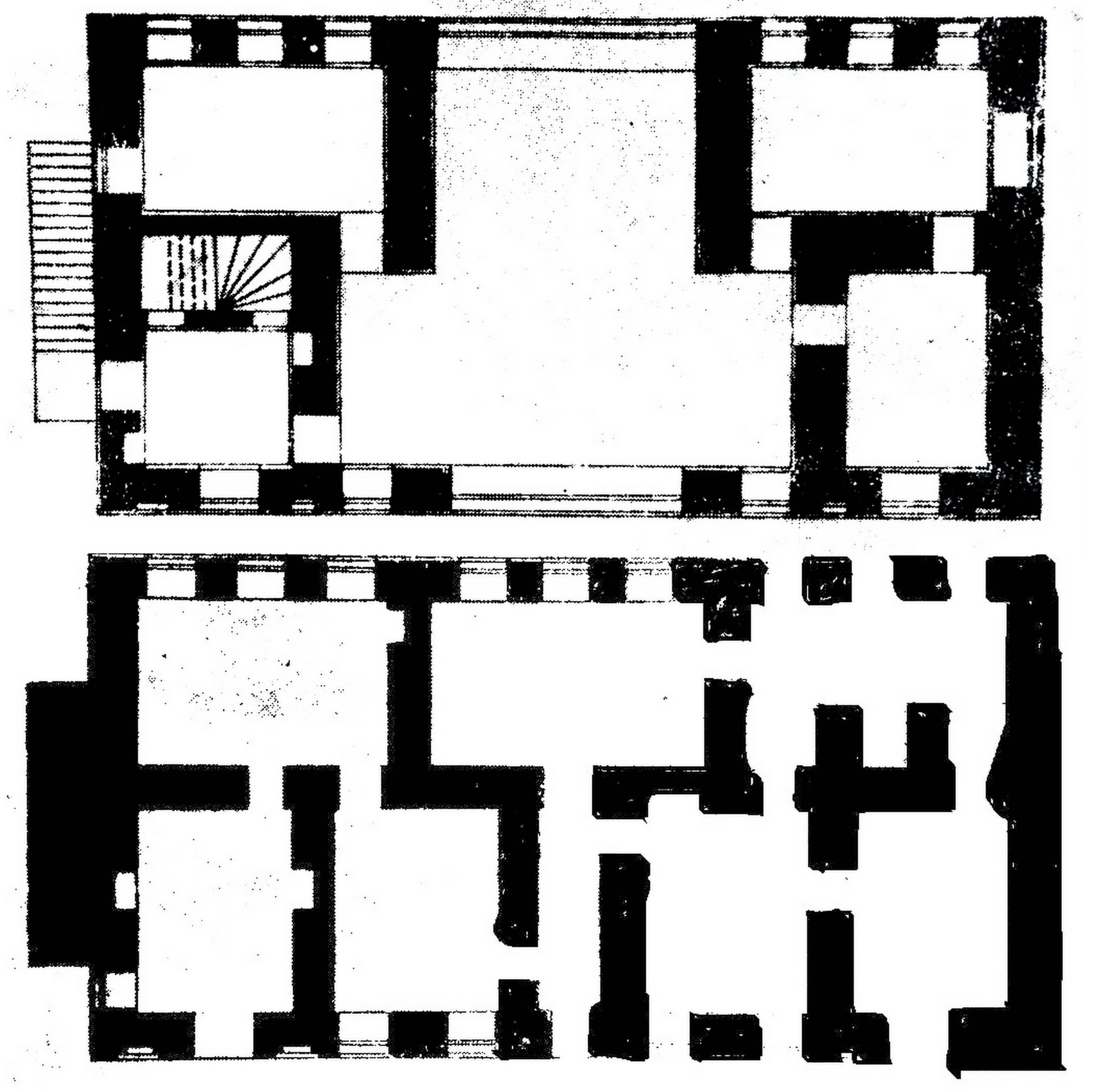
The plan of the first and second floor of the palace

== Sources ==
- Avalov, E. V. (1977). Архитектура города Шуши и проблемы сохранения его исторического облика (in Russian). Baku: Elm.
- Kaziyeva, M. A. (1960). "Город Шуша. Дом Хуршуд Бану Натаван". Азербайджан (Исторические и достопримечательные места) (in Russian). Baku: Издательство АН Азербайджанской ССР.
- Sarkisov, Ashot; Alizadeh, Ali Ashraf (1950). О некоторых архитектурных памятниках Шуши (Памятники архитектуры Азербайджана (сборник материалов) (in Russian). Vol. 2. Moscow and Baku.
- Durch, William J. (1996). UN Peacekeeping, American Politics, and the Uncivil Wars of the 1990s. New York: Palgrave Macmillan. ISBN 0-312-12930-0.
- Goble, Paul (12 November 2020). "Shusha Once Again Key to War and Peace Between Armenia and Azerbaijan". Eurasia Daily Monitor. 17 (160). Jamestown Foundation.
